Islamic terrorism (also known as Islamist terrorism or radical Islamic terrorism) refers to terrorist acts with religious motivations carried out by fundamentalist militant Islamists and Islamic extremists.

Incidents and fatalities from Islamic terrorism have been concentrated in eight Muslim-majority countries (Afghanistan, Egypt, Iraq, Libya, Nigeria, Pakistan, Somalia, and Syria), while four Islamic extremist groups (Islamic State, Boko Haram, the Taliban, and al-Qaeda) were responsible for 74% of all deaths from terrorism in 2015. The annual number of fatalities from terrorist attacks grew sharply from 2011 to 2014 when it reached a peak of 33,438, before declining to 13,826 in 2019.

Since at least the 1990s, these terrorist incidents have occurred on a global scale, affecting not only Muslim-majority countries in Africa and Asia, but also Russia, Australia, Canada, Israel, India, the United States, China, the Philippines, Thailand, and countries within Europe. Such attacks have targeted both Muslims and non-Muslims, with one study finding 80% of terrorist victims to be Muslims. In a number of the worst-affected Muslim-majority regions, these terrorists have been met by armed, independent resistance groups, state actors and their proxies, and elsewhere by condemnation by prominent Islamic figures. Journalists have also become targets of Islamic terrorism, particularly for the depiction of the Islamic prophet Muhammad, with the Charlie Hebdo shooting being protested by millions in France.

Justifications given for attacks on civilians by Islamic extremist groups come from their interpretations of the Quran, the hadith, and sharia law. These include retribution by armed jihad for the perceived injustices of unbelievers against Muslims; the belief that the killing of many self-proclaimed Muslims is required because they have violated Islamic law and are disbelievers (takfir); the overriding necessity of restoring and purifying Islam by establishing sharia law, especially by restoring the Caliphate as a pan-Islamic state (especially ISIS); the glory and heavenly rewards of martyrdom; the supremacy of Islam over all other religions.

The use of the phrase "Islamic terrorism" is disputed. In Western political speech, it has variously been called "counter-productive", "highly politicized, intellectually contestable" and "damaging to community relations", by those who disapprove of the characterization 'Islamic'.
Others have condemned the avoidance of the term as an act of "self-deception", "full-blown censorship" and "intellectual dishonesty".

Terminology 
George W. Bush and Tony Blair  (US president and UK Prime Minister respectively at the time of the September 11 attacks) repeatedly stated that the war against terrorism has nothing to do with Islam.  Others inside and out of the Islamic world who oppose its use on the grounds there is no connection between Islam and terrorism include  Imran Khan, the prime minister of Pakistan, and academic Bruce Lawrence.
Former US president Barack Obama explained why he used the term "terrorism" rather than "Islamic terrorism" in a 2016 townhall meeting saying, "There is no doubt, ... terrorist organisations like Al-Qaeda or ISIL – They have perverted and distorted and tried to claim the mantle of Islam for an excuse for basically barbarism and death ... But what I have been careful about when I describe these issues is to make sure that we do not lump these murderers into the billion Muslims that exist around the world ..."

It has been argued that "Islamic terrorism" is a misnomer for what should be called "Islamist terrorism". Others have called Obama's avoidance of the term "self-deception", "full-blown censorship", and "intellectual dishonesty".

In January 2008, the US Department of Homeland Security Office for Civil Rights and Civil Liberties issued a report titled "Terminology to Define the Terrorists: Recommendations from American Muslims", which opened with

The office "consulted with some of the leading U.S.-based scholars and commentators on Islam to discuss the best terminology to use when describing the terrorist threat." Among the experts they consulted,

History

Pre-20th century 
Whether Islamic terrorism is a recent phenomenon is disputed. Some maintain that there was no terrorism in Islam prior to late 20th and early 21st century. 

Others such as Ibn Warraq claim that from the beginning of Islam, "violent movements have arisen" such as the Kharijites, Sahl ibn Salama, Barbahari, Kadizadeli movement, Ibn Abd al-Wahhab, etc., "seeking to revive true Islam, which its members felt had been neglected in Muslim societies, who were not living up to the ideals of the earliest Muslims".  The 7th century Kharijites, according to some, started from an essentially political position but developed extreme doctrines that set them apart from both mainstream Sunni and Shi'a Muslims. The group was particularly noted for adopting a radical approach to takfir, whereby they declared Muslim opponents to be unbelievers and therefore worthy of death, and also by their strong resemblance to contemporary ISIL.

1960s–1970s 

After failed attempts at state formation and the creation of Israel in the post-colonial era, a series of Marxist and anti-Western transformations and movements swept throughout the Arab and Islamic world. These movements were nationalist and revolutionary not Islamic, but their view that terrorism could be effective in reaching their political goals generated the first phase of modern international terrorism. In the late 1960s, Palestinian secular movements such as Al Fatah and the Popular Front for the Liberation of Palestine (PFLP) began to target civilians outside the immediate arena of conflict. Following Israel's 1967 defeat of Arab forces, Palestinian leaders began to see that the Arab world was unable to militarily confront Israel. During the same time, lessons drawn from revolutionary movements in Latin America, North Africa, Southeast Asia as well as during the Jewish struggle against Britain in Palestine, saw the Palestinians turn away from guerrilla warfare towards urban terrorism. These movements were secular in nature but their international organization served to spread terrorist tactics worldwide.

After the decisive defeat by Israel of Arab armies led by Arab nationalist regimes in the Six-Day War, religiously motivated/Islamic movements grew  in the Middle East and came into conflict with secular nationalism. Islamic groups were supported by Saudi Arabia, to counter nationalist ideology.

According to Bruce Hoffman of the RAND Corporation, in 1980, 2 out of 64 terrorist groups were categorized as having religious motivation while in 1995, almost half (26 out of 56) were religiously motivated with the majority having Islam as their guiding force.

1980s–1990s 
The Soviet–Afghan War and the subsequent anti-Soviet mujahedin war, lasting from 1979 to 1989, started the rise and expansion of terrorist groups. Since their beginning in 1994, the Pakistani-supported Taliban militia in Afghanistan has gained several characteristics traditionally associated with state-sponsors of terrorism, providing logistical support, travel documentation, and training facilities. Since 1989 the increasing willingness of religious extremists to strike targets outside immediate country or regional areas highlights the global nature of contemporary terrorism. The 1993 bombing of the World Trade Center, and the 11 September 2001 attacks on the World Trade Center and Pentagon, are representative of this trend.

2000s–2010s 
Many of the victims were Muslims, including most of the victims who were killed in attacks involving 12 or more deaths.

2010s 
According to the Global Terrorism Index, deaths from terrorism peaked in 2014 and have fallen  each year since then until 2019 (the last year the study had numbers for), making a decline of more than half (59% or 13,826 deaths) from their peak. The five countries "hardest hit" by terrorism continue to be Muslims countries—Afghanistan, Iraq, Nigeria, Syria and Somalia.

Attacker profiles and motivations 

The motivation of Islamic terrorists has been disputed. Some (such as Maajid Nawaz, Graeme Wood, and Ibn Warraq) attribute it to extremist interpretations of Islam;  others (Mehdi Hasan) to some combination of political grievance and social-psychological maladjustment;  and still others (such as James L. Payne and  Michael Scheuer) to a struggle against "U.S./Western/Jewish aggression, oppression, and exploitation of Muslim lands and peoples".

Religious motivation 
Daniel Benjamin and Steven Simon, in their book, The Age of Sacred Terror, argue that Islamic terrorist attacks are motivated by religious fervor. They are seen as "a sacrament ... intended to restore to the universe a moral order that had been corrupted by the enemies of Islam." Their attacks are neither political nor strategic but an "act of redemption" meant to "humiliate and slaughter those who defied the hegemony of God".

One of the Kouachi brothers responsible for the Charlie Hebdo shooting called a French journalist, saying, "We are the defenders of Prophet Mohammed."

According to Indonesian Islamic leader Yahya Cholil Staquf in a 2017 Time interview, within the classical Islamic tradition the relationship between Muslims and non-Muslims is assumed to be one of segregation and enmity. In his view extremism and terrorism are linked with "the basic assumptions of Islamic orthodoxy" and that radical Islamic movements are nothing new. He also added that Western politicians should stop pretending that extremism is not linked to Islam.

According to journalist Graeme Wood "much of what" one major Islamic terror group -- ISIS -- "does looks nonsensical except in light of a sincere, carefully considered commitment to returning civilization to a seventh-century legal environment" of Muhammad and his companions, "and ultimately to bringing about the apocalypse" and Judgement day. ISIS group members insist "they will not—cannot—waver from governing precepts that were embedded in Islam by the Prophet Muhammad and his earliest followers".

Shmuel Bar argues that while the importance of political and socioeconomic factors in Islamist terrorism is not in doubt, "In order to comprehend the motivation for these acts and to draw up an effective strategy for a war against terrorism, it is necessary to understand the religious-ideological factors — which are deeply embedded in Islam."

David Scharia, counterterrorism official of the United Nations Security Council believes religiously motivated terrorism (like Islamic terrorism) works by creating an extremist ideological milieu which "legitimizes violence in the name of that ideology". This motivates not only those who are trained, funded, and/or coordinated by terror groups, but also so-called "lone wolf" attackers.

Examining Europe, two studies of the background of Muslim terrorists—one of the UK and one of France—found little connection between terrorist acts performed in the name of Islam and the religious piety of the operatives. A "restricted" 2008 UK report of hundreds of case studies by the domestic counter-intelligence agency MI5 found that there was no "typical profile" of a terrorist, and that

A 2015 "general portrait" of "the conditions and circumstances" under which people living in France become "Islamic radicals" (terrorists or would-be terrorists) by Olivier Roy (see above) found radicalisation was not an "uprising of a Muslim community that is victim to poverty and racism: only young people join, including converts".

Roy believes terrorism/radicalism is "expressed in religious terms" because

 most of the radicals have a Muslim background, which makes them open to a process of re-Islamisation ("almost none of them having been pious before entering the process of radicalisation"), and
 jihad is "the only cause on the global market". If you kill in silence, it will be reported by the local newspaper; "if you kill yelling 'Allahu Akbar', you are sure to make the national headlines". Other extreme causes—ultra-left or radical ecology are "too bourgeois and intellectual" for the radicals.

Somewhat in contradiction to this, a study surveying Muslims in Europe to examine how much Islamist ideology increases support for terrorism, found that "in Western countries affected by homegrown terrorism ... justifying terrorism is strongly associated with an increase in religious practice". (This is not the case in European "countries where Muslims are predominant"—Bosnia, Albania, etc. -- where the opposite seems to be true, i.e. the more importance respondents assigned to religion in their life, the less likely they were to "justifying political violence".)

Denominations/Ideologies 
Most strains of thought/schools/sects/movements/denominations/traditions of Islam do not support or otherwise associate themselves with terrorism.
According to Mir Faizal, only three sects or movements of Islam—the Sunni sects of Salafi, Deobandi, and Barelvi.—have been associated with violence against civilians. Of the three, only Salafi Islam—specifically Salafi jihadism Islam—can be called involved in global terrorism, as it is connected with Al-Qaeda, ISIS, Boko Haram and other groups. (Terrorism among some members of the  Barelvi sect is limited to attacks on alleged blasphemers in Pakistan, and the terrorism among Deobandi groups has "almost no" influence beyond Afghanistan, Pakistan and Indian.) Another sect/movement known as Wahhabism (intertwined with non-jihadist Salafism) has been accused of being the ideology behind Islamic terrorist groups,  but Al Qaeda and other terrorists are more commonly  described as  following a fusion of Qutbism and Wahhabism.

Outside of these sects or religious movements, the religious ideology of Qutbism has influenced Islamic terrorism, along with religious themes and trends including  Takfir, suicide attacks, and the belief that Jews and Christians are not People of the Book but infidels/kafir waging "war on Islam". (These ideas are often related and overlapping.)

Qutbism 
Qutbism is named after Egyptian Islamist theoretician Sayyid Qutb, who wrote a manifesto (known as Milestones), while in prison. Qutb is said to have laid out
the ideological foundation of Salafi jihadism  (according to Bruce Livesey);  his ideas are said to have formed "the modern Islamist movement" (according to Gilles Kepel);
which along with other "violent Islamic thought", became the  ideology known as "Qutbism that is the "center of gravity" of al-Qaeda and related groups  (according to U.S. Army Colonel Dale C. Eikmeier).
Qutb is thought to be a major influence on Al-Qaeda #2 leader, Ayman al-Zawahiri.

In his manifesto (called "one of the most influential works in Arabic of the last half century"), Qutb preached:
the absolute necessity of enforcement of sharia law ("even more necessary than the establishment of the Islamic belief", without which Islam does not exist);
the need for violent jihad as well as preaching to bring back sharia law and spread Islam, (a vanguard "movement" will use "physical power and Jihad", to remove "material obstacles");
that offensive jihad—attacking non-Muslim territory—ought not neglected by true Muslims in favor of defensive jihad, (this "diminish[s] the greatness of the Islamic way of life", and is the work of those who have been "defeated by the attacks of the treacherous Orientalists!"  Muslims should not let lack of non-Muslim aggression stop them from waging Jihad to spread sharia law because "truth and falsehood cannot coexist on earth" in peace.
a loathing of "the West" (a "rubbish heap ... filth ... hollow and worthless");
... which is deliberately undermining Islam (pursuing a "well-thought-out scheme" to "demolish the structure of Muslim society");
... despite the fact it "knows" it is inferior to Islam (It "knows that it does not possess anything which will satisfy its own conscience and justify its existence", so that when confronted with the "logic, beauty, humanity and happiness" of Islam, "the American people blush");
and a loathing and hatred of Jews ("world Jewry, whose purpose is to eliminate ... the limitations imposed by faith and religion, so that Jews may penetrate into body politics of the whole world and then may be free to perpetuate their evil designs [such as] usury, the aim of which is that all the wealth of mankind end up in the hands of Jewish financial institutions ...").

Eikmeier summarizes the tenets of Qutbism as being:
 A belief that Muslims have deviated from true Islam and must return to "pure Islam" as originally practiced during the time of Muhammad.
 The path to that "pure Islam" is only through a literal and strict interpretation of the Quran and Hadith, along with implementation of Muhammad's commands.
 Muslims should interpret the original sources individually without being bound to follow the interpretations of Islamic scholars.
 Any interpretation of the Quran from a historical, contextual perspective is a corruption, and that the majority of Islamic history and the classical jurisprudential tradition is mere sophistry.

While Sayyid Qutb preached that all of the Muslim world had become apostate or jahiliyah, he did not specifically takfir or call for the execution of any apostates, even those governing non-sharia governments       Qutb did however emphasize that "the organizations and authorities" of the putatively Muslim countries were irredeemably corrupt and evil and would have to be abolished by "physical power and Jihad", by a "vanguard" movement of true Muslims.

One who did argue this was Muhammad abd-al-Salam Faraj, the main theoretician of the Islamist group that assassinated Egyptian President Anwar Sadat.  who in his book  Al-Farida al-gha'iba (The Neglected Duty), cited a fatwa issued in 1303 CE by the celebrated strict medieval jurist Ibn Taymiyyah. He had ruled that fighting and killing of the Mongol invaders who were invading Syria was not only permitted but obligatory according to Sharia. This was because the Mongols did not follow sharia law, and so even though they had converted to Islam (Ibn Taymiyyah argued) they were not really Muslims. Faraj preached that rulers such as Anwar Sadat were "rebels against the Laws of God [the shari'ah]", and "apostates from Islam" who have preserved nothing of Islam except its name.

Wahabism/Salafism 
Another Islamic movement accused of being involved in terrorism is known as Wahabism.

Sponsored by oil exporting power Saudi Arabia, Wahabism is deeply conservative and anti-revolutionary (its founder taught that Muslims are obliged to give unquestioned allegiance  to their ruler, however imperfect,  so long as he leads the community according to the laws of God),
Nonetheless, this ideology and its sponsors have been accused of assisting terrorism both
indirectly—by "creating" an environment from late 1970s to 2010 that "supported the spread of extremist ideologies"; despite its conservatism, Wahhabism shares important doctrinal points with forms of Islamism—a strong "revulsion" against Western influences, a belief in strict implementation of injunctions and prohibitions of sharia law, an opposition to both Shia Islam and popular Islamic religious practices (the veneration of Muslim saints), and a belief in the importance of armed jihad.
and directly—through inadvertent and intentional funding of terrorist groups and through its influence on at least two major terrorist groups --  the Taliban and the Islamic State.

Up until at least 2017 or so (when Saudi Crown Prince Muhammad bin Salman declared Saudi Arabia was returning to "moderate Islam"),
Saudi Arabia  spent  many billions, not only through the Saudi government but through Islamic organizations,  religious charities, and private sources,
on dawah wahhabiya, i.e. spreading the Wahhabi interpretation of Islam,
This funding incentivized Muslim "schools, book publishers, magazines, newspapers, or even governments" around the world to "shape their behavior, speech, and thought in such a way as to incur and benefit from Saudi largesse," and so propagate Wahhabi doctrines;

The hundreds of Islamic colleges and Islamic centers, over a thousand  mosques and schools for Muslim children, it financed 
often featured Wahhabi-friendly curriculum and religious materials
such as textbooks explaining that all forms of Islam except Wahhabism were deviation, or the twelfth grade Saudi text that "instructs students that it is a religious obligation to do 'battle' against infidels in order to spread the faith".

Wahhabi-friendly works distributed for free "financed by petroleum royalties" included those of Ibn Taymiyyah (author of the fatwa mentioned above against rulers who do not rule by sharia law).

Not least, the successful 1980–1990 jihad against Soviet occupation of Afghanistan—that inspired non-Afghan jihad veterans to continue jihad in their own country or other—benefited from  billions of dollars in Saudi financing, as well as "weaponry and intelligence".

Religious interpretations 
The "root cause" of Muslim terrorism is extremist ideology, according to Pakistani theologian Javed Ahmad Ghamidi, specifically the teachings that:
"Only Muslims have the right to rule, non-Muslims are meant to be subjugated";
"Modern nation states are unIslamic and constitute kufr (disbelief)";
the only truly Islamic form of state is a unified Muslim Caliphate;
"when Muslims obtain power they will overthrow non-Muslim governments and rule";
"The punishment of kufr (disbelief) and irtidad (apostasy) is death and must be implemented".
Other authors have noted other elements of extremist Islamic ideology.

The afterlife and religious justification for killing noncombatants 
Al Qaeda justification for the killing of civilian bystanders following its first attack (see above) based on a Ibn Taymiyyah's fatwa was described by author Lawrence Wright,

An influential tract Management of Savagery (Idarat at-Tawahhush), explains away mass killing in part by the fact that even "if the whole umma [community of Muslims] perishes they would all be martyrs". Similarly, author Ali A. Rizvi has described the chat room reaction of a Taliban supporter to his (Rizvi's) condemnation of the 2014 Peshawar school massacre—that the 132 school children the Taliban slaughtered were "not dead" because they had been killed "in the way of God ... Don't call them dead. They are alive, but we don't perceive it" (citing), and maintaining that those whose Islamic faith is "pure" would not be upset with the Taliban's murder of children either.

Superiority of the afterlife
Observers (such as Ibn Warraq) have noted how widely Islamic scripture has emphasized the worthlessness of the temporal world (Dunya) in comparison to the hereafter (Akhirah) (example: "O Allah! There is no life worth living except the life of the Hereafter ..."), and God's anger towards those who do not agree (example: "These are the ones who trade the Hereafter for the life of this world. So their punishment will not be reduced, nor will they be helped" Q.2:86).

Ibn Warraq finds these scripture "remarkably similar" to a number of public statements by jihadists:
"Today you are fighting divine soldiers  who love death for Allah like you love life" (Hamas Chief of Staff Muhammad Deif addressing Israelis in 2014),
"We love death like our enemies love life" (Hamas leader Ismail Haniyeh on Al-Aqsa TV in 2014)
"The Americans love Pepsi-Cola, we love death." (Afghan jihadist Maulana Inyadullah addressing a British reporter in 2001)
"The world is but a passage ... what is called life in this world is not life but death" (Ayatollah Khomeini in 1977, commemorating his son's death)
"...The sons of the land of the two holiest sites [Mecca and Medina] ... I say this to you, These youths love death as you love life" (Osama bin Laden addressing U.S. Secretary of Defense William Perry in 1996 fatwa)

Martyrdom/Istishhad

Terror attacks requiring the death of the attacker are generally referred to as suicide attacks/bombings by the media, but when done by Islamists their perpetrators generally call such an attack Istishhad (or in English "martyrdom operation"), and the suicide attacker shahid (pl. shuhada, literally 'witness' and usually translated as 'martyr'). The idea being that the attacker died in order to testify his faith in God, for example while waging jihad bis saif (jihad by the sword). The term "suicide" is never used because Islam has strong strictures against taking one's own life.

According to author Sadakat Kadri, "the very idea that Muslims might blow themselves up for God was unheard of before 1983, and it was not until the early 1990s that anyone anywhere had tried to justify killing innocent Muslims who were not on a battlefield." After 1983 the process was limited among Muslims to Hezbollah and other Lebanese Shi'a factions for more than a decade.

Since then, the "vocabulary of martyrdom and sacrifice", videotaped pre-confession of faith by attackers have become part of "Islamic cultural consciousness", "instantly recognizable" to Muslims (according to Noah Feldman), while the tactic has spread through the Muslim world "with astonishing speed and on a surprising course".

"War against Islam" 

A tenant of Qutbism and other militant Islamists is that Western policies and society are not just un-Islamic or exploitive, but actively anti-Islamic, or as it is sometimes described, waging a "war against Islam". Islamists (such as Qutb) often identify what they see as a historical struggle between Christianity and Islam, dating back as far as the Crusades, among other historical conflicts between practitioners of the two respective religions.

In 2006, Britain's then head of MI5 Eliza Manningham-Buller said of Al-Qaeda that it "has developed an ideology which claims that Islam is under attack, and needs to be defended". "This," she said "is a powerful narrative that weaves together conflicts from across the globe, presenting the West's response to varied and complex issues, from long-standing disputes such as Israel/Palestine and Kashmir to more recent events as evidence of an across-the-board determination to undermine and humiliate Islam worldwide." She said that the video wills of British suicide bombers made it clear that they were motivated by perceived worldwide and long-standing injustices against Muslims; an extreme and minority interpretation of Islam promoted by some preachers and people of influence; their interpretation as anti-Muslim of UK foreign policy, in particular the UK's involvement in Iraq and Afghanistan."

In his call for jihad, Osama bin Laden almost invariably described his enemies as aggressive and his action against them as defensive.  Defensive jihad differs from offensive jihad by being "fard al-ayn", or a personal obligation of all Muslims, rather than "fard al-kifaya", a communal obligation, (that is, some Muslims must perform it but it is not required of all). Thus, if Al-Qaeda's portrayal of its jihad as defensive has the advantage of tapping into sympathy for victims of aggression, while putting it at the very highest religious priority for all good Muslims.

Enmity towards non-Muslims 

In addition to its alleged aggression, Islamist militants, scholars, and leaders support attacks on Christians and Jews on the theological grounds that they are infidels, and on Western society on the grounds that its secularism and rampant free expression have led to the proliferation of pornography, immorality,  homosexuality, feminism, etc..

An Islamist (Karam Kuhdi) arrested in Egypt in 1981 for his part in a campaign of robbing and killing Christian goldsmiths explained his reasoning to police interrogating him and surprised by his non-mainstream beliefs. Kuhdi told them that he and others did not hold with the conventional Islamic doctrine that Christians were "people of the book" and dhimmi subject to protection, but instead were infidels subject to violent jihad. (Tourists—often non-Muslim—were also a common target of Islamic terrorists in Egypt.) Kuhdi quoted Quranic verses: 'Those who say that God is Jesus, son of Mary, are infidels' and  'combat those of the people of the book who are infidels', explaining the Islamists view that the infidels are "the people of the book, since they have not believed in this book".

According to a doctrine known as al-wala' wa al-bara (literally, "loyalty and disassociation"), Wahhabi founder Abd al-Wahhab argued that it was "imperative for Muslims not to befriend, ally themselves with, or imitate non-Muslims or heretical Muslims", and that this "enmity and hostility of Muslims toward non-Muslims and heretical had to be visible and unequivocal".

This principle has been emphasized by Ayman al-Zawahiri (leader of al-Qaeda since June 2011),  Abu Muhammad al-Maqdisi (Jihadi theorist), Hamoud al-Aqla al-Shu'aybi (conservative Sudi scholar who supported the 9/11 attacks), and a number of Salafi preachers, Ahmad Musa Jibril, Abdullah el-Faisal.

After the 2016 Orlando nightclub shooting was described as a "hate crime", (the 49 victims murdered allegedly in vengeance for American airstrikes against Daesh were customers of an LGBT nightclub),  the official Daesh magazine Dabiq responded:  "A hate crime? Yes. Muslims undoubtedly hate liberalist sodomites, .... An act of terrorism? Most definitely. Muslims have been commanded to terrorize the disbelieving enemies of Allah."

Although bin Laden almost always emphasized the alleged oppression of Muslims by America and Jews when talking about the need for jihad in his messages, in his "Letter to America", he answered the question, "What are we calling you to, and what do we want from you?" with

Takfir 

According to traditional Islamic law, the blood of someone who leaves Islam is "forfeit"—i.e. they are condemned to death.  This applies not only to self-proclaimed ex-Muslims, but to those who still believe themselves to be Muslims but who  (in the eyes of their accusers) have deviated too far from orthodoxy.  

Many contemporary liberal/modernist/reformist Muslims believe killing appostates to be in violation of the Quranic injunction 'There is no compulsion in religion....' (Q.2:256), but even earlier generations of  Islamic scholars warned against making such accusations (known as takfir), without great care and usually reserved the punishment of death for "extreme, persistent and aggressive" proponents of religious innovation (bidʻah). The danger, according to some (such as Gilles Kepel), was that "used wrongly or unrestrainedly,  ... Muslims might resort to mutually excommunicating one another and thus propel the Ummah to complete disaster."

Kepel noted that some of Qutb's early followers believed that his declaration that the Muslim world has reverted to pre-Islamic ignorance (Jahiliyyah), should be taken literally and everyone outside of their movement takfired; and Wahhabis has been known for their  willingness to takfir non-Wahhabi Muslims.

Since the last half of the 20th century, a "central ideology" of insurgent Wahhabist/Salafi jihadist groups has been the "sanctioning" of "violence against leaders" of Muslim majority states who do not enforce sharia (Islamic law) or are otherwise "deemed insufficiently religious".
Some  insurgent groups -- Al-Gama'a al-Islamiyya of Egypt, and later GIA, the Taliban,  and ISIL) -- are thought to have gone even further,  applying takfir and its capital punishment against not only to Sunni government authorities and Shia Muslims, but to ordinary Sunni civilians who disagree with/disobeyed insurgent policies such as reinstituting slavery.

In 1977, the group Jama'at al-Muslimin (known to the public as Takfir wal-Hijra), kidnapped and later killed an  Islamic scholar and former Egyptian government minister Muhammad al-Dhahabi.  The founder of Jama'at al-Muslimin, Shukri Mustaf  had been imprisoned with Sayyid Qutb, and had become one of Qutb's "most radical" disciples. He believed that not only was the Egyptian government apostate, but so was "Egyptian society as a whole" because it was "not fighting the Egyptian government and had thus accepted rule by non-Muslims".  While police broke up the group, it  reorganized with thousands of members, some of whom went on to help assassinate the Egyptian president Anwar Sadat, and join the Algerian Civil War and Al-Qaeda.  During the 1990s, a violent Islamic insurgency in Egypt, primarily perpetrated by Al-Gama'a al-Islamiyya, targeted not only police and government officials but also civilians, killing or wounding 1106 persons in one particularly bloody year (1993).

In the brutal 1991–2002 Algerian Civil War, takfir of the general Algerian public was known to have been declared by the hardline Islamist Armed Islamic Group of Algeria (GIA). The GIA amir, Antar Zouabri claimed credit for two massacres of civilians (Rais and Bentalha massacres), calling the killings an "offering to God" and declaring impious the victims and all Algerians who had not joined its ranks. He declared that "except for those who are with us, all others are apostates and deserving of death," (Tens, and sometimes hundreds, of civilians were killed in each of a series of massacres that started in April 1998. However, how many murders were the doing of GIA and how many of the security forces—who had infiltrated the insurgents and were not known for their probity—is not known.)

In August 1998 the Taliban insurgents slaughtered 8000 mostly Shia Hazara non-combatants in Mazar-i-Sharif, Afghanistan. Comments by Mullah Niazi, the Taliban commander of the attack and newly installed governor,  declared in a number of post-slaughter speeches from Mosques in Mazar-i-Sharif: "Hazaras are not Muslim, they are Shi'a. They are kofr [infidels]. The Hazaras killed our force here, and now we have to kill Hazaras. ... You either accept to be Muslims or leave Afghanistan. ...",  indicated that along with revenge, and/or ethnic hatred, takfir  was a motive for the slaughter.

From its inception in 2013 to 2020, directly or through affiliated groups,  Daesh), "has been responsible for 27,947 terrorist deaths", the majority of these have been Muslims, "because it has regarded them as kafir".

One example of Daesh takfir is found in the 13th issue of its magazine Dabiq, which  dedicated "dozens of pages ... to attacking and explaining the necessity of killing Shia", who the group refers to by the label Rafidah

Daesh not only called for the revival of slavery of non-Muslims (specifically of the Yazidi minority group), but declared takfir on any Muslim who disagreed with their policy.

Starting in 2013, Daesh began "encouraging takfir of Muslims deemed insufficiently pure in regard of tawhid (monotheism)". The Taliban were found "to be "a 'nationalist' movement, all too tolerant" of Shia. In 2015 ISIL "pronounced Jabhat al-Nusrat -- then al-Qaida's affiliate in Syria -- an apostate group."

Interpretations of the Qur'an and Hadith 

Donald Holbrook, a Research Fellow at the Centre for the Study of Terrorism and Political Violence, analyzes a sample of 30 works by jihadist propagandists for references to Islamic scripture that justifies the objectives of violent jihad. An-Nisa (4:74–75) is quoted most frequently; other popular passages are At-Taubah (9:13–15, 38–39, 111), Al-Baqarah (2:190–191, 216), and Surah 9:5:

Holbrook notes that the first part "slay the idolaters ..." is oft quoted but not the limiting factors at the end of the ayat. Peter Bergen notes that bin Laden cited this verse in 1998 when making a formal declaration of war.

Jihad and Islamic jurisprudence 

Techniques of war are restricted by classical Islamic jurisprudence, but its scope is not. Bernard Lewis states that ultimately Jihad ends when  the entire world is brought under Islamic rule and law. Classical Islamic jurisprudence imposes, without limit of time or space, the duty to subjugate non-Muslims, (according to Lewis). Wael Hallaq writes that some radical Islamists go beyond the classical theory to insist that the purpose of jihad is to overthrow regimes oppressing Muslims and bring non-Muslims to convert to Islam. In contrast, Islamic modernists–who Islamists despise–view jihad as defensive and compatible with modern standards of warfare. To justify their acts of religious violence, jihadist individuals and networks resort to the nonbinding genre of Islamic legal literature (fatwa) developed by jihadi-Salafist legal authorities, whose legal writings are shared and spread via the Internet.

Al-Qaeda
While Islamic opponents of attacks on civilians have quoted numerous prophetic hadith and hadith by Muhammad's first successor Abu Bakr, Al-Qaeda believes its attacks are religiously justified.
After its first attack on a US target that killed civilians instead (a 1992 bombing of a hotel in Aden Yemen), Al Qaeda justified the killing of civilian bystanders through an interpretation (by one Abu Hajer) based on medieval jurist Ibn Taymiyyah (see above).

In a post-9/11 work, "A Statement from Qaidat al-Jihad Regarding the Mandates of the Heroes and the Legality of the Operations in New York and Washington", Al-Qaeda provided a more systematic justification—one that provided "ample theological justification for killing civilians in almost any imaginable situation."  Among these justifications are that America is leading the countries of the West in waging war on Islam, which (al-Qaeda alleges) targets "Muslim women, children and elderly". This means any attacks on America are a defense of Islam, and any treaties and agreements between Muslim majority states and Western countries that would be violated by attacks are null and void. Other justifications for killing and situations where killings is allowed based on precedents in early Islamic history include:  killing non-combatants  when it is too difficult to distinguish between them and combatants when attacking an enemy "stronghold" (hist), and/or non-combatants remain in enemy territory; killing those who assist the enemy "in deed, word, mind", this includes civilians since they can vote in elections that bring enemies of Islam to power; necessity of killing in the war to protect Islam and Muslims; when the prophet was asked whether Muslim fighters could use the catapult against the village of Taif, even though the enemy fighters were mixed with a  civilian population, he indicated in the affirmative; killing women, children and other protected groups is allowed when they serve as human shields for the enemy; killing of civilians is permitted if the enemy has broken a treaty.

Supporters of bin Laden have pointed to reports according to which the Islamic prophet Muhammad attacked towns at night or with catapults, and argued that he must have condoned incidental harm to noncombatants, since it would have been impossible to distinguish them from combatants during such attacks. These arguments were not widely accepted by Muslims.

Management of Savagery
Al-Qaeda's splinter groups and competitors, Jama'at al-Tawhid wal-Jihad and the Islamic State of Iraq and Syria, are thought to have been heavily influenced by a 2004 work on jihad entitled Management of Savagery (Idarat at-Tawahhush), written by Abu Bakr Naji and intended to provide a strategy to create a new Islamic caliphate by first destroying "vital economic and strategic targets" and terrifying the enemy with cruelty to break its will.

The tract asserts that "one who previously engaged in jihad knows that it is naught but violence, crudeness, terrorism, deterrence and massacring,"  and  that even "the most abominable of the levels of savagery" of jihad are better "than stability under the order of unbelief"—those orders being any regime other than ISIL.
Victims should not only be beheaded, shot, burn alive in cages or gradually submerged until drowned, but these events should be publicized with videos and photographs.

The Jurisprudence of Blood

Some observers have noted the evolution in the rules of jihad—from the original "classical" doctrine to that of 21st-century Salafi jihadism. According to the legal historian Sadarat Kadri, during the last couple of centuries, incremental changes in Islamic legal doctrine (developed by Islamists who otherwise condemn any bid'ah (innovation) in religion), have "normalized" what was once "unthinkable". "The very idea that Muslims might blow themselves up for God was unheard of before 1983, and it was not until the early 1990s that anyone anywhere had tried to justify killing innocent Muslims who were not on a battlefield."

The first or the "classical" doctrine of jihad which was developed towards the end of the 8th century, emphasized the "jihad of the sword" (jihad bil-saif) rather than the "jihad of the heart", but it contained many legal restrictions which were developed from interpretations of both the Quran and the Hadith, such as detailed rules involving "the initiation, the conduct, the termination" of jihad, the treatment of prisoners, the distribution of booty, etc. Unless there was a sudden attack on the Muslim community, jihad was not a "personal obligation" (fard 'ayn); instead it was a "collective one" (fard al-kifaya), which had to be discharged "in the way of God" (fi sabil Allah), and it could only be directed by the caliph, "whose discretion over its conduct was all but absolute." (This was designed in part to avoid incidents like the Kharijia's jihad against and killing of Caliph Ali, since they deemed that he was no longer a Muslim). Martyrdom resulting from an attack on the enemy with no concern for your own safety was praiseworthy, but dying by your own hand (as opposed to the enemy's) merited a special place in Hell. The category of jihad which is considered to be a collective obligation is sometimes simplified as "offensive jihad" in Western texts.

Based on the 20th-century interpretations of Sayyid Qutb, Abdullah Azzam, Ruhollah Khomeini, al-Qaeda and others, many if not all of those self-proclaimed jihad fighters believe that defensive global jihad is a personal obligation, which means that no caliph or Muslim head of state needs to declare it. Killing yourself in the process of killing the enemy is an act of martyrdom and it brings you a special place in Heaven, not a special place in Hell; and the killing of Muslim bystanders (nevermind Non-Muslims), should not impede acts of jihad. Military and intelligent analyst Sebastian Gorka described the new interpretation of jihad as the "willful targeting of civilians by a non-state actor through unconventional means."

Islamic theologian Abu Abdullah al-Muhajir has been identified as one of the key theorists and ideologues behind modern jihadist violence. His theological and legal justifications influenced Abu Musab al-Zarqawi, al-Qaeda member and former leader of al-Qaeda in Iraq, as well as several other jihadi terrorist groups, including ISIL and Boko Haram. Zarqawi used a 579-page manuscript of al-Muhajir's ideas at AQI training camps that were later deployed by ISIL, known in Arabic as Fiqh al-Dima and referred to in English as The Jurisprudence of Jihad or The Jurisprudence of Blood. The book has been described by counter-terrorism scholar Orwa Ajjoub as rationalizing and justifying "suicide operations, the mutilation of corpses, beheading, and the killing of children and  non-combatants". The Guardians journalist Mark Towsend, citing Salah al-Ansari of Quilliam, notes: "There is a startling lack of study and concern regarding this abhorrent and dangerous text [The Jurisprudence of Blood] in almost all Western and Arab scholarship". Charlie Winter of The Atlantic describes it as a "theological playbook used to justify the group's abhorrent acts". He states:

Clinical psychologist Chris E. Stout also discusses the al Muhajir-inspired text in his essay, Terrorism, Political Violence, and Extremism (2017). He assesses that jihadists regard their actions as being "for the greater good"; that they are in a "weakened in the earth" situation that renders Islamic terrorism a valid means of solution.

Economic motivation 

Following the 9/11 attack, commentators noted the poverty of Afghanistan, and speculated that blame might partly fall on a lack of a "higher priority to health, education, and economic development" funding by richer countries, and "stagnant economies and a paucity of jobs" in poorer countries.

Among the acts of oppression against Muslims by the United States and its allies alleged by the head of Al-Qaeda, are economic exploitation. In a 6 October 2002 message by Osama bin Laden 'Letter to America', he alleges

In a 1997 interview, he claimed that "since 1973, the price of petrol has increased only $8/barrel while the prices of other items have gone up three times. The oil prices should also have gone up three times but this did not happen", (On the other hand, in an interview five weeks after the destruction the World Trade Center towers his operation was responsible for, bin Laden described the towers as standing for—or "preaching"—not exploitation or capitalism, but "freedom human Rights, and equality".)

In 2002, academics Alan B. Krueger and Jitka Maleckova found "a careful review of the evidence provides little reason for optimism that a reduction in poverty or an increase in educational attainment would by themselves, meaningfully reduce international terrorism."  Alberto Abadie found "the risk of terrorism is not significantly higher for poorer countries, once other country-specific characteristics are considered", but instead seems to correlate with a country's "level of political freedom".

Martin Kramer has argued that while terrorist organizers are seldom poor, their "foot-soldiers" often are. Andrew Whitehead states that "poverty creates opportunity" for terrorists, who have hired desperate poor children to do grunt work in Iraq and won the loyalty of poor in Lebanon by providing social services.

Western foreign policy 
Many believe that groups like Al-Qaeda and ISIS which are reacting to aggression by non-Muslim (especially US) powers, and that religious beliefs are overstated if not irrelevant in their motivation.
According to a graph by U.S. State Department, terrorist attacks escalated worldwide following the United States' 2001 invasion of Afghanistan and 2003 invasion of Iraq. Dame Eliza Manningham Buller, the former head of MI5, told the Iraq inquiry, the security services warned Tony Blair launching the War on Terror would increase the threat of terrorism. Robert Pape has argued that at least terrorists utilizing suicide attacks—a particularly effective form of terrorist attack—are driven not by Islamism but by "a clear strategic objective: to compel modern democracies to withdraw military forces from the territory that the terrorists view as their homeland". However, Martin Kramer, who debated Pape on origins of suicide bombing, stated that the motivation for suicide attacks is not just strategic logic but also an interpretation of Islam to provide a moral logic. For example, Hezbollah initiated suicide bombings after a complex reworking of the concept of martyrdom. Kramer explains that the Israeli occupation of the South Lebanon Security Zone raised the temperature necessary for this reinterpretation of Islam, but occupation alone would not have been sufficient for suicide terrorism. "The only way to apply a brake to suicide terrorism," Kramer argues, "is to undermine its moral logic, by encouraging Muslims to see its incompatibility with their own values."

Breaking down the content  of Osama bin Laden's statements and interviews collected in Bruce Lawrence's Messages to the World (Lawrence shares Payne's belief in US imperialism and aggression as the cause of Islamic terrorism), James L. Payne found that 72% of the content was on the theme of "criticism of U.S./Western/Jewish aggression, oppression, and exploitation of Muslim lands and peoples" while only 1% of bin Laden's statements focused on criticizing "American society and culture".

Former CIA analyst Michael Scheuer argues that terrorist attacks (specifically al-Qaeda attacks on targets in the United States) are not motivated by a religiously inspired hatred of American culture or religion, but by the belief that U.S. foreign policy has oppressed, killed, or otherwise harmed Muslims in the Middle East, condensed in the phrase "They hate us for what we do, not who we are." U.S. foreign policy actions Scheuer believes are fueling Islamic terror include: the US–led intervention in Afghanistan and invasion of Iraq; Israel–United States relations, namely, financial, military, and political support for Israel; U.S. support for "apostate" police states in Muslim nations such as Egypt, Algeria, Morocco, and Kuwait; U.S. support for the creation of an independent East Timor from territory previously held by Muslim Indonesia; perceived U.S. approval or support of actions against Muslim insurgents in India, the Philippines, Chechnya, and Palestine.

Maajid Nawaz and Sam Harris argue that in many cases there is simply no connection between acts of Islamic extremism and Western intervention in Muslim lands.

Nawaz also argues that suicide bombers in non-Muslim majority countries such as the 7 July 2005 bombers can be said to motivated by ideology not by any desire to compel UK military to withdraw from "their homeland", as they were born and raised in Yorkshire. They had never set foot in Iraq and do not speak its language.

Socio-psychological motivations 
Simon Cottee in the New York Times suggested that sexual frustration is a major motivating factor in Islamist suicide bombing.

Socio-psychological development 
A motivator of violent radicalism (not just found in Al-Qaeda and ISIS) is psychological development during adolescence.
Cally O'Brien found many terrorists were "not exposed to the West in a positive context, whether by simple isolation or conservative family influence, until well after they had established a personal and social identity." Looking at theories of psychological personal identity Seth Schwartz, Curitis Dunkel and Alan Waterman found two types of "personal identities" susceptible to radicalization leading to terrorism:
 "Foreclosed and authoritarian" — Principally conservative Muslims who are often taught by their family and communities from early childhood to not deviate from a strict path and to either consider inferior or hate outside groups. When exposed to (alien) western culture, they are likely to judge it relative to their perception of the correct order of society, as well as perceive their own identities and mental health to be at risk.
 "Diffuse and aimless" — Principally converts whose lives are characterized by "aimlessness, uncertainty and indecisiveness" and who have neither explored different identities nor committed to a personal identity. Such people are "willing to go to their deaths for ideas [such as jihadism] that they have appropriated from others" and that give their lives purpose and certainty.

Characteristics of terrorists 

In 2004, a forensic psychiatrist and former foreign service officer, Marc Sageman, made an "intensive study of biographical data on 172 participants in the jihad" in his book Understanding Terror Networks. He concluded social networks, the "tight bonds of family and friendship", rather than emotional and behavioral disorders of "poverty, trauma, madness, [or] ignorance", inspired alienated young Muslims to join the jihad and kill.

According to anthropologist Scott Atran, a NATO researcher studying suicide terrorism, as of 2005, the available evidence contradicts a number of simplistic explanations for the motivations of terrorists, including mental instability, poverty, and feelings of humiliation. The greatest predictors of suicide bombings—one common type of terror tactic used by Islamic terrorists—turns out to be not religion but group dynamics.
While personal humiliation does not turn out to be a motivation for those attempting to kill civilians, the perception that others with whom one feels a common bond are being humiliated can be a powerful driver for action. "Small-group dynamics involving friends and family that form the diaspora cell of brotherhood and camaraderie on which the rising tide of martyrdom actions is based". Terrorists, according to Atran, are social beings influenced by social connections and values. Rather than dying "for a cause", they might be said to have died "for each other".

In a 2011 doctoral thesis, anthropologist Kyle R. Gibson reviewed three studies documenting 1,208 suicide attacks from 1981 to 2007 and found that countries with higher polygyny rates correlated with greater production of suicide terrorists. Political scientist Robert Pape has found that among Islamic suicide terrorists, 97 percent were unmarried and 84 percent were male (or if excluding the Kurdistan Workers' Party, 91 percent male), while a study conducted by the U.S. military in Iraq in 2008 found that suicide bombers were almost always single men without children aged 18 to 30 (with a mean age of 22), and were typically students or employed in blue-collar occupations. In addition to noting that countries where polygyny is widely practiced tend to have higher homicide rates and rates of rape, political scientists Valerie M. Hudson and Bradley Thayer have argued that because Islam is the only major religious tradition where polygyny is still largely condoned, the higher degrees of marital inequality in Islamic countries than most of the world causes them to have larger populations susceptible to suicide terrorism, and that promises of harems of virgins for martyrdom serves as a mechanism to mitigate in-group conflict within Islamic countries between alpha and non-alpha males by bringing esteem to the latter's families and redirecting their violence towards out-groups.

Along with his research on the Tamil Tigers, Scott Atran found that Palestinian terrorist groups (such as Hamas) provide monthly stipends, lump-sum payments, and massive prestige to the families of suicide terrorists. Citing Atran and other anthropological research showing that 99 percent of Palestinian suicide terrorists are male, that 86 percent are unmarried, and that 81 percent have at least six siblings (larger than the average Palestinian family size), cognitive scientist Steven Pinker argues in The Better Angels of Our Nature (2011) that because the families of men in the West Bank and Gaza often cannot afford bride prices and that many potential brides end up in polygynous marriages, the financial compensation of an act of suicide terrorism can buy enough brides for a man's brothers to have children to make the self-sacrifice pay off in terms of kin selection and biological fitness (with Pinker also citing a famous quotation attributed to evolutionary biologist J. B. S. Haldane when Haldane quipped that he would not sacrifice his life for his brother but would for "two brothers or eight cousins").

In 2007, scholar Olivier Roy described the background of the hundreds of global (as opposed to local) terrorists who were incarcerated or killed and for whom authorities have records, as being surprising in a number of ways: The subjects frequently had a Westernized background; there were few Palestinians, Iraqis, or Afghans "coming to avenge what is going on in their country"; there was a lack of religiosity before radicalization through being "born again" in a foreign country; a high percentage of subjects had converted to Islam; their backgrounds were "de-territorialized "—meaning, for example, they were "born in a country, then educated in another country, then go to fight in a third country and take refuge in a fourth country"; and their beliefs about jihad differed from  traditional ones—i.e. they believed jihad to be permanent, global, and "not linked with a specific territory." Roy believes terrorism/radicalism is "expressed in religious terms" among the terrorists studied because

 most of the radicals have a Muslim background, which makes them open to a process of re-Islamisation ("almost none of them having been pious before entering the process of radicalisation"), and
 jihad is "the only cause on the global market". If you kill in silence, it will be reported by the local newspaper; "if you kill yelling 'Allahu Akbar', you are sure to make the national headlines". Other extreme causes—ultra-left or radical ecology are "too bourgeois and intellectual" for the radicals.

Author Lawrence Wright described the characteristic of "displacement" of members of the most famous Islamic terrorist group, al-Qaeda:

This profile of global Jihadists differs from that found among more recent local Islamist suicide bombers in Afghanistan. According to a 2007 study of 110 suicide bombers by Afghan pathologist Dr. Yusef Yadgari, 80% of the attackers studied had some kind of physical or mental disability. The bombers were also "not celebrated like their counterparts in other Muslim nations. Afghan bombers are not featured on posters or in videos as martyrs." Daniel Byman, a Middle East expert at the Brookings Institution, and Christine Fair, an assistant professor in peace and security studies at Georgetown University, argue that many of the Islamic terrorists are foolish and untrained, perhaps even untrainable, with one in two Taliban suicide bombers killing only themselves.

Studying 300 cases of people charged with jihadist terrorism in the United States since 11 September 2001, author Peter Bergen found the perpetrators were "generally motivated by a mix of factors", including "militant Islamist ideology;" opposition to "American foreign policy in the Muslim world; a need to attach themselves to an ideology or organization that gave them a sense of purpose"; and a "cognitive opening" to militant Islam that often was "precipitated by personal disappointment, like the death of a parent".

However, two studies of the background of Muslim terrorists in Europe—one of the UK and one of France—found little connection between religious piety and terrorism among the terrorist rank and file. A "restricted" report of hundreds of case studies by the UK domestic counter-intelligence agency MI5 found that

A 2015 "general portrait" of "the conditions and circumstances" under which people living in France become "Islamic radicals" (terrorists or would-be terrorists) by Olivier Roy (see above) found radicalisation was not an "uprising of a Muslim community that is victim to poverty and racism: only young people join, including converts".

Refutations, criticisms and explanations for decline

Refuting Islamic terrorist 

Along with explaining Islamic terrorism, many observers have attempted to point out their inconsistencies and the flaws in their arguments, often suggesting means of de-motivating potential terrorists.

Princeton University Middle Eastern scholar Bernard Lewis argues that although bin Laden and other radical Islamists claim they are fighting to restore shariah law to the Muslim world, their attacks on civilians violate the classical form of that Islamic jurisprudence. The "classical jurists of Islam never remotely considered [jihad] the kind of unprovoked, unannounced mass slaughter of uninvolved civil populations". In regard to the September 11 attacks Lewis noted,

Similarly, Timothy Winter writes that the proclamations of bin Laden and Ayman al-Zawahiri "ignore 14 centuries of Muslim scholarship", and that if they "followed the norms of their religion, they would have had to acknowledge that no school of mainstream Islam allows the targeting of civilians."

Researcher Donald Holbrook notes that while many jihadists quote the beginning of the famous sword verse (or ayah):
But when these months, prohibited (for fighting), are over, slay the idolaters wheresoever you find them, and take them captive or besiege them, and lie in wait for them at every likely place. ...
... they fail to quote and discuss limiting factors that follow,
".... But if they repent and fulfill their devotional obligations and pay the zakat, then let them go their way, for God is forgiving and kind."
showing how they are (Holbrook argues) "shamelessly selective in order to serve their propaganda objectives."
Peter Bergen notes that bin Laden cited this verse in 1998 when making a formal declaration of war.

The scholarly credentials of the ideologues of extremism are also "questionable". Dale C. Eikmeier notes

Michael Sells and Jane I. Smith (a professor of Islamic Studies) write that barring some extremists like al-Qaeda, most Muslims do not interpret Qur'anic verses as promoting warfare today but rather as reflecting historical contexts. According to Sells, most Muslims "no more expect to apply" the verses at issue "to their contemporary non-Muslim friends and neighbors than most Christians and Jews consider themselves commanded by God, like the Biblical Joshua, to exterminate the infidels."

In his book No god but God: The Origins, Evolution, and Future of Islam, Iranian-American academic Reza Aslan argues that there is an internal battle currently taking place within Islam between individualistic reform ideals and the traditional authority of Muslim clerics.  The struggle is similar to that of the 16th-century reformation in Christianity, and in fact is happening when the religion of Islam is as "old" as Christianity was at the time of its reformation. Aslan argues that "the notion that historical context should play no role in the interpretation of the Koran—that what applied to Muhammad's community applies to all Muslim communities for all time—is simply an untenable position in every sense."

Despite their proclaimed devotion to the virtue of Sharia law, Jihadists have not always avoided association with the pornography of the despised West. The Times (London) newspaper has pointed out that  Jihadists were discovered by one source to have sought anonymity through some of the same dark networks used to distribute child pornography—quite ironic given their proclaimed piety. Similarly, Reuters news agency reported that pornography was found among the materials seized from Osama bin Laden's Abbottabad compound that was raided by U.S. Navy SEALs.

Takfir
Despite the fact that a founding principle of modern violent jihad is the defense of Islam and Muslims, most victims of attacks by Islamic terrorism ("the vast majority" according to one source—J.J. Goldberg) are self-proclaimed Muslims.  Many if not all Salafi-Jihadi groups practice takfir—i.e. proclaim that some self-proclaimed Muslims (especially government officials and security personnel) are actually apostates deserving of death.

Furthermore, the more learned salafi-jihadi thinkers and leaders are (and were), the more reluctance they are/were to embrace takfir (according to a study by Shane Drennan). The late Abdullah Yusuf Azzam, "the godfather of the Afghan jihad", for example, was an Islamic scholar and university professor who avoided takfir and preached unity in the ummah (Muslim community). The Islamic education of Al-Qaeda's number two leader, Ayman al-Zawahiri, was early and much more informal—he was not a trained scholar—and al-Zawahiri expanded the definition of kafir to include many self-proclaimed Muslims. He has maintained that civilian government employees of Muslim states, security forces and any persons collaborating or engaging with these groups are apostates, for example.

Two extreme takfiris -- Abu Musab al-Zarqawi, a Sunni jihadist leader in Iraq, and Djamel Zitouni, leader of the Algerian Armed Islamic Group of Algeria (GIA) during the Algerian civil war—had even broader definitions of apostasy and less religious knowledge. Al-Zarqawi was a petty criminal who had no religious training until he was 22 and limited training thereafter. Famous for bombing targets other jihadis thought off limits, his definition of apostates included all Shia Muslims and "anyone violating his organization's interpretation of Shari'a". Djamel Zitouni was the son of a chicken farmer with little Islamic education. He famously expanded the GIA's definition of apostate until he concluded the whole of Algerian society outside of the GIA "had left Islam".  His attacks led to the deaths of thousands of Algerian civilians.

De-radicalization
Evidence that more religious training may lead to less extremism has been found in Egypt. That country's largest radical Islamic group, al-Jama'a al-Islamiyya — which killed at least 796 Egyptian policemen and soldiers from 1992 to 1998 — renounced bloodshed in 2003 in a deal with the Egyptian government where  a series of high-ranking members were released (as of 2009 "the group has perpetrated no new terrorist acts").  A second group Egyptian Islamic Jihad made a similar agreement in 2007. Preceding the agreements was program where Muslim scholars debated with imprisoned group leaders arguing that true Islam did not support terrorism.

Muslim attitudes toward terrorism 

The opinions of Muslims on the subject of attacks on civilians by Islamist groups vary. Fred Halliday, a British academic specialist on the Middle East, argues that most Muslims consider these acts to be egregious violations of Islam's laws. Muslims living in the West denounce the 11 September attacks against United States, while Hezbollah contends that their rocket attacks against Israeli targets are defensive jihad by a legitimate resistance movement rather than terrorism.

Views of modern Islamic scholars 

In reference to suicide attacks, Hannah Stuart notes there is a "significant debate among contemporary clerics over which circumstance permit such attacks."  Qatar-based theologian, Yusuf al-Qaradawi, criticized the 9/11 attacks but previously justified suicide bombings in Israel on the grounds of necessity and justified such attacks in 2004 against American military and civilian personnel in Iraq. According to Stuart, 61 contemporary Islamic leaders have issued fatawa permitting suicide attacks, 32 with respect to Israel. Stuart points out that all of these contemporary rulings are contrary to classical Islamic jurisprudence.

Charles Kurzman and other authors have collected statements by prominent Muslim figures and organizations condemning terrorism.
In September 2014, an open letter to ISIS by "over 120 prominent Muslim scholars" denounced that group for "numerous religious transgressions and abominable crimes".

Although Islamic terrorism is commonly associated with the Salafis and Wahhabis, government-affiliated scholars of the groups have constantly denied any connection and attributed claims that there is to ignorance, misunderstanding and sometimes insincere research and deliberate misleading by rival groups. Following the September 11 attacks, Abdul-Azeez ibn Abdullaah Aal ash-Shaikh, the Grand Mufti of the Kingdom of Saudi Arabia, made an official statement that "the Islamic Sharee'ah (legislation) does not sanction" such actions. A Salafi "Committee of Major Scholars" in Saudi Arabia has declared that "Islamic" terrorism, such as the May 2003 bombing in Riyadh, are in violation of Sharia law and aiding the enemies of Islam.

Fethullah Gülen, a prominent Turkish Islamic scholar, has claimed that "a real Muslim", who understood Islam in every aspect, could not be a terrorist.  Other people with similar points of view include Ahmet Akgunduz, Harun Yahya and Muhammad Tahir-ul-Qadri. Huston Smith, an author on comparative religion, argued that extremists have hijacked Islam, just as has occurred periodically in Christianity, Hinduism and other religions throughout history. He added that the real problem is that extremists do not know their own faith.

Ali Gomaa, former Grand Mufti of Egypt, stated not only for Islam but in general: "Terrorism cannot be born of religion. Terrorism is the product of corrupt minds, hardened hearts, and arrogant egos, and corruption, destruction, and arrogance are unknown to the heart attached to the divine."

A 600-page legal opinion (fatwa) by Muhammad Tahir-ul-Qadri condemned suicide bombings and other forms of terrorism as kufr (unbelief), stating that it "has no place in Islamic teaching and no justification can be provided for it, or any kind of excuses or ifs or buts." Iranian Ayatollah Ozma Seyyed Yousef Sanei has preached against suicide attacks and stated in an interview: "Terror in Islam, and especially Shiite, is forbidden."

A group of Pakistani clerics of Jamaat Ahl-e-Sunnah (Barelvi movement) who were gathered for a convention denounced suicide attacks and beheadings as un-Islamic in a unanimous resolution. On 2 July 2013 in Lahore, 50 Muslim scholars of the Sunni Ittehad Council (SIC) issued a collective fatwa against suicide bombings, the killing of innocent people, bomb attacks, and targeted killings. It considers them to be forbidden.

According to Javed Ahmad Ghamidi, the only purposes of Islamic jihad are putting an end to persecution—even that of the non-Muslims—and making the religion of Islam reign supreme in the Arabian peninsula, the latter type being specific to Muhammad and no longer operative; it can only be waged under a sovereign state; there are strict ethical limits for jihad which do not allow fighting non-combatants; acts of terrorism including suicide bombing are prohibited.

Opinion surveys 
 Gallup conducted tens of thousands of hour-long, face-to-face interviews with residents of more than 35 predominantly Muslim countries between 2001 and 2007. It found that more than 90% of respondents condemned the killing of non-combatants on religious and humanitarian grounds. John Esposito, using poll data from Gallup, wrote in 2008 that Muslims and Americans were equally likely to reject violence against civilians. He also found that those Muslims who support violence against civilians are no more religious than Muslims who do not.
 An earlier poll, conducted in 2005 by the Fafo Foundation in the Palestinian Authority, found that 65% of respondents supported the 9/11 attacks.
 A subsequent Gallup poll released in 2011 suggested "that one's religious identity and level of devotion have little to do with one's views about targeting civilians... it is human development and governance—not piety or culture—that are the strongest factors in explaining differences in how the public perceives this type of violence." The same poll concluded that populations of countries in the Organisation of the Islamic Conference were slightly more likely to reject attacks on civilians in all cases, both military and individual, than those in non-member countries.
 Pew Research surveys in 2008, show that in a range of countries—Jordan, Pakistan, Indonesia, Lebanon, and Bangladesh—there have been substantial declines in the percentages saying suicide-bombings and other forms of violence against civilian targets can be justified to defend Islam against its enemies. Wide majorities say such attacks are, at most, rarely acceptable. The shift of attitudes against terror has been especially dramatic in Jordan, where 29% of Jordanians were recorded as viewing suicide-attacks as often or sometimes justified (down from 57% in May 2005). In the largest majority-Muslim nation, Indonesia, 74% of respondents agree that terrorist attacks are "never justified" (a substantial increase from the 41% level to which support had risen in March 2004); in Pakistan, that figure is 86%; in Bangladesh, 81%; and in Iran, 80%.
 In Pakistan, despite the recent rise in the Taliban's influence, a poll conducted by Terror Free Tomorrow in Pakistan in January 2008 tested support for al-Qaeda, the Taliban, other militant Islamist groups and Osama bin Laden himself, and found a recent drop by half. In August 2007, 33% of Pakistanis expressed support for al-Qaeda; 38% supported the Taliban. By January 2008, al-Qaeda's support had dropped to 18%, the Taliban's to 19%. When asked if they would vote for al-Qaeda, just 1% of Pakistanis polled answered in the affirmative. The Taliban had the support of 3% of those polled.
 A December 2008 poll conducted in Osama bin Laden's home country of Saudi Arabia showed that his compatriots have dramatically turned against him, his organisation, Saudi volunteers in Iraq, and terrorism in general. Indeed, confidence in bin Laden has fallen in most Muslim countries in recent years.

Tactics

Suicide attacks 

Hezbollah were the first to use suicide bombers in the Middle East. An increasingly popular tactic used by terrorists is suicide bombing. This tactic is used against civilians, soldiers, and government officials of the regimes the terrorists oppose. A recent clerical ruling declares terrorism and suicide bombing as forbidden by Islam. However, groups who support its use often refer to such attacks as "martyrdom operations" and the suicide-bombers who commit them as "martyrs" (Arabic: shuhada, plural of "shahid"). The bombers, and their sympathizers often believe that suicide bombers, as martyrs (shaheed) to the cause of jihad against the enemy, will receive the rewards of paradise for their actions.

Hijackings 
Islamic terrorism sometimes employs the hijacking of passenger vehicles. The most infamous were the "9/11" attacks that killed nearly 3,000 people on a single day in 2001, effectively ending the era of aircraft hijacking.

Hostage taking, kidnappings and executions 

Along with bombings and hijackings, Islamic terrorists have made extensive use of highly publicised kidnappings and executions (i.e. ritualized murders), often circulating videos of the acts for use as propaganda. A frequent form of execution by these groups is decapitation, another is shooting. In the 1980s, a series of abductions of American citizens by Hezbollah during the Lebanese Civil War resulted in the 1986 Iran–Contra affair. During the chaos of the Iraq War, more than 200 kidnappings foreign hostages (for various reasons and by various groups, including purely criminal) gained great international notoriety, even as the great majority (thousands) of victims were Iraqis. In 2007, the kidnapping of Alan Johnston by Army of Islam resulted in the British government meeting a Hamas member for the first time.
Motivations
Islamist militants, including Boko Haram, Hamas, al-Qaeda and the ISIS, have used kidnapping as a method of fundraising, as a means of bargaining for political concessions, and as a way of intimidating potential opponents.

As political tactic 
An example of political kidnapping occurred in September 2014, in the Philippines. The German Foreign Ministry reported that the Islamist militant group Abu Sayyaf had kidnapped two German nationals and was threatening to kill them unless the German government withdraw its support for the war against ISIS and also pay a large ransom. In September 2014 an Islamist militant group kidnapped a French national in Algeria and threatened to kill the hostage unless the government of France withdrew its support for the war against ISIS.

Islamist self-justifications 
According to the International Business Times, in October 2014 the Islamic State of Iraq and the Levant (ISIL) released a five-point justification of its right to take non-Muslims hostage, and decapitate, ransom or enslave them. British Muslim cleric Anjem Choudary told The Clarion Project that kidnapping and even beheading hostages is justified by Islam.

ISIL also published an article entitled, 'The revival (of) slavery before the Hour (of Judgement Day)', in its online magazine, "Dabiq", justifying its kidnapping of  Yazidi women and forcing them to become sex slaves or concubines:  "One should remember that enslaving the families of the kuffar—the infidels—and taking their women as concubines is a firmly established aspect of the Shariah, or Islamic law."

Abubakar Shekau, the leader of the Nigerian extremist group Boko Haram, said in a 2014 interview claiming responsibility for the 2014 Chibok kidnapping of 270+ schoolgirls, "Slavery is allowed in my religion, and I shall capture people and make them slaves".

Kidnapping as revenue 
Nasir al-Wuhayshi leader of the Islamist militant group Al-Qaida in the Arabian Peninsula describes kidnapped hostages as "an easy spoil... which I may describe as a profitable trade and a precious treasure."

A 2014 investigation, by journalist Rukmini Maria Callimachi published in The New York Times demonstrated that between 2008 and 2014, Al Qaeda and groups directly affiliated with al-Qaeda took in over US$125 million from kidnapping, with $66 million of that total paid in 2013 alone. The article showed that from a somewhat haphazard beginning in 2003, kidnapping grew into the group's main fundraising strategy, with targeted, professional kidnapping of civilians from wealthy European countries—principally France, Spain and Switzerland—willing to pay huge ransoms. US and UK nationals are less commonly targeted since these governments have shown an unwillingness to pay ransom.

Boko Haram kidnapped Europeans for the Ransom their governments would pay in the early 2010s. For example, in the spring of 2013, Boko Haram kidnapped and within 2 months released a French family of 7 and 9 other hostages in exchange for a payment by the French government of $3.15 million.

According to Yochi Dreazen writing in Foreign Policy, although ISIS received funding from Qatar, Kuwait and other Gulf oil states, "traditional criminal techniques like kidnapping", are a key funding source for ISIS. Armin Rosen writing in Business Insider, kidnapping was a "crucial early source" of funds as ISIS expanded rapidly in 2013.  In March, upon receiving payment from the government of Spain, ISIS released 2 Spanish hostages working for the newspaper El Mundo, correspondent Javier Espinosa and photographer Ricardo Garcia Vilanova, who had been held since September 2013. Philip Balboni, CEO of GlobalPost told the press that he had spent "millions" in efforts to ransom journalist James Foley, and an American official told the Associated Press that demand from ISIS was for 100 million ($132.5).  In September 2014, following the release of ISIS Beheading videos of journalists James Foley and Steven Sotloff, British Prime Minister David Cameron appealed to members of the G7 to abide by their pledges not to pay ransom "in the case of terrorist kidnap".

Holding foreign journalists as hostages is so valuable to ISIS that Rami Jarrah, a Syrian who has acted as go-between in efforts to ransom foreign hostages, told the Wall Street Journal that ISIS had "made it known" to other militant groups that they "would pay" for kidnapped journalists. ISIS has also kidnapped foreign-aid workers and Syrians who work for foreign-funded groups and reconstruction projects in Syria.  By mid-2014, ISIS was holding assets valued at US$2 billion.

Kidnapping as psychological warfare 
Boko Haram has been described as using kidnapping as a means of intimidating the civilian population into non-resistance.

According to psychologist Irwin Mansdorf, Hamas demonstrated effectiveness of kidnapping as a form of psychological warfare in the 2006 capture of the Israeli soldier Gilad Shalit when public pressure forced the government of Israel to release 1027 prisoners, including 280 convicted of terrorism by Israel, in exchange for his release. According to The New York Times, "Hamas has recognized the pull such incidents have over the Israeli psyche and clearly has moved to grab hostages in incidents such as the death and ransoming of Oron Shaul."

Internet recruiting 

In the beginning of the 21st century, emerged a worldwide network of hundreds of web sites that inspire, train, educate and recruit young Muslims to engage in jihad against the United States and other Western countries, taking less prominent roles in mosques and community centers that are under scrutiny. According to The Washington Post, "Online recruiting has exponentially increased, with Facebook, YouTube and the increasing sophistication of people online".

Examples of organizations and acts 

Some prominent Islamic terror groups and incidents include the following:

Africa 
In the 1990s, a distinct pattern of jihadist attacks in East Africa emerged. In 2006, the Islamic Courts Union (ICU) defeated Somali warlords which resulted in an armed jihadist movement controlling a territory of their own. The ICU was later militarily defeated and al-Shabaab was formed from its remnants. Al-Shabaab would later ally itself with al-Qaeda. In 2017, the EUISS noted an increased frequency of jihadist violence in an arc extending across borders from the Red Sea to the Gulf of Guinea.

Algeria 

The Armed Islamic Group, active in Algeria between 1992 and 1998, was one of the most violent Islamic terrorist groups, and is thought to have takfired the Muslim population of Algeria. Its campaign to overthrow the Algerian government included civilian massacres, sometimes wiping out entire villages in its area of operation. It also targeted foreigners living in Algeria, killing more than 100 expatriates in the country. In recent years it has been eclipsed by a splinter group, the Salafist Group for Preaching and Combat (GSPC), now called Al-Qaeda Organization in the Islamic Maghreb.

Burkina Faso 
In January 2016, terrorists from Al-Qaeda in the Islamic Maghreb (AQIM) shot and killed 30 people at the Splendid Hotel in Ougadougou.

In an August 2017 Ouagadougou attack 19 people were killed, and 25 others were injured when al-Qaeda's Maghreb jihadists affiliates opened fire on a Turkish restaurant and hotel.

During the March 2018 Ouagadougou attacks, terrorists affiliated with Al-Qaeda in the Islamic Maghreb killed 8 people and injured more than 85.

The terrorist organization Ansar ul Islam is active in Burkina Faso and has conducted assassinations, looting, attacks on police and has closed hundreds of schools.

Egypt 

Egypt has faced Islamist violence in repeated attacks since the 2011 Arab Spring uprising.

On 17 November 1997, a splinter group of the al-Jama'a al-Islamiyya, an Egyptian Islamist organization, carried out the Luxor massacre where 62 people were killed. Most of the killed were tourists.

On 29 December 2017 in Cairo, a gunman opened fire at the Coptic Orthodox Church of Saint Menas and a nearby shop owned by a Coptic man. Ten citizens and a police officer were killed around ten people were injured in the attack which was claimed by the Islamic state.

Kenya 

During the 1990s Muslims in Kenya received religious radical instruction from Al-Qaeda and Somali group l-Itihad al-Islami (AIAI). AIAI sought to create an Islamic government over Somalia and the Ogaden region in Ethiopia. In Kenya, it recruited among Somalis in Kenya living in the North Eastern Province and the Eastleigh district in Nairobi.

On 7 August 1998, Al-Qaeda attacked the U.S. Embassy in Nairobi in an attack that claimed 213 lives.

On 28 November 2002, Al-Qaeda militants attacked an Israeli-owned hotel in Mombasa where 15 were killed. Militants also fired shoulder-launched anti-aircraft missiles at an airliner which escaped unharmed.

On Saturday 21 September 2013, four Al-Shabaab militants attacked a shopping mall in Nairobi, shooting and throwing grenades at shoppers. The civilian death toll was 61, along with six soldiers and five of the attackers.

In 2015, 147 people were killed by Al-Shabaab militants during the Garissa University College attack.

After Al-Shabaab abducted foreign aid workers and tourists in Kenya, Kenyan troops were sent to Somalia in October 2011 to pursue al-Shabab militants. In the wake of the intervention, Kenya has suffered a number of attacks carried out both by al-Shabaab militants as well as Kenyan Muslim recruited by radical clerics in North-Eastern and Coast provinces.

Mali

Mauritius 
In 2011 Mauritian shop-keeper Reaz Lauthan travelled to Syria to join Islamic State and participate in the war. In Mauritius Reaz Lauthan had established Al Muhajiroun, an organisation which promoted the relinquishment of Islamic traditions that originated from India. However Lauthan's group disintegrated and he made his way to Syria. He returned to Mauritius in 2012 and befriended members of a new  Islamic group called Hizb ul Tahrir. He died in 2013 in Syria soon after returning there to participate in Islamic State's activities. 4 other Mauritians had attempted to join Reaz Lauthan in Syria but were refused entry at the Turkish border.

In August 2014 Mauritians Mohammed Iqbal Golamaully, aged 48, and his wife, Nazimabee Golamaully, aged 45, provided financial support to their nephew Zafirr Golamaully who had left Mauritius in March 2014 to fight for Islamic State in Syria after travelling via Dubai and Turkey. The couple was eventually jailed in 2016. Zafirr Golamaully's sister Lubnaa also left Mauritius to join him in Syria. Hospital director Mohammed Iqbal Golamaully had also encouraged Lubnaa to become familiar with the new gun that Zafirr had purchased for her. Mohammed Iqbal Golamaully also instructed Lubnaa to "revolutionise the Islamic Concept amongst our close relatives". Using a pseudonym "Abu Hud" Zafirr Golamaully posted hate messages on Twitter following the terrorist attack against magazine Charlie Hebdo in Paris in January 2015. On other social media sites Zafirr Golamaully used pseudonym "Paladin of Jihad" to provide advice to would-be jihadists on how to avoid deportation by Turkish immigration officials.

In December 2015 Islamic State issued a video on social media which showed Mauritian citizen Yogen Sundrun who used his pseudonym Abu Shuaib Al Afriqi to claim that IS fighters will liberate Mauritius soon. The video prominently featured a flag of Daesh. Yogen Sundrun also urged other Mauritians, especially nurses and doctors, to travel to the lands of Islamic State. In 2014 Yogen Sundrun had released an earlier video, intended for South Africans at the time of Eid, and encouraging them to join the "Caliphate of Daesh". In that video he held his daughter in his arms and stated "This is my fifth daughter in the Khilafah, praise be God. Brothers and sisters, I don't have the words to express myself about the happiness to be here…". Around him children held fire-arms.

During the night of Sunday 29 May 2016 and the following morning, several gunshots were fired at the French Embassy located in the capital city Port Louis. Graffiti was also painted by the attackers on the front fence of the compound which referred to Islamic State and claims that their prophet Abu Bakr Baghdadi had been insulted.

Following the murder of Manan Fakhoo in January 2021, who was shot dead in Beau-Bassin by hitmen riding a motorbike, Javed Meetoo, a resident of Vallee Pitôt and member of Daesh (Islamic State), was arrested and charged with "harbouring terrorist" on 14 March 2022. In March 2021 Yassiin Meetou had confessed that he had assisted shooter Ajmal Aumeeruddy and Ajam Beeharry of Camp Yoloff by transporting them and their motorbike to shoot Manan Fakhoo.

Morocco 

The majority of the perpetrators directly and indirectly involved in the 2004 Madrid train bombings were Moroccans. In the aftermath of that attack, Morocco became a focus of attention for anti-terrorist authorities in Spain.

While Morocco is generally seen as a secure destination for tourists as the last terrorist attack happened in 2011 where 17 people were killed by bomb at a restaurant in Marrakesh, over 1600 people have travelled from Morocco to join the Islamic State in the Syrian Civil War. Moroccan authorities initially ignored the people who joined ISIS but later on realised they could return to commit terrorist offences in Morocco. As a result, the Bureau Central d'Investigations Judiciaires (BCIJ) was formed.

In the 2013–2017 period anti-terrorist authorities in Morocco, in cooperation with their counterparts in Spain, conducted up to eleven joint operations against jihadist cells and networks.

In 2016, the government developed a strategy to further adherence to the Maliki Islamic school of thought. The authorities removed Quranic passages that were deemed too violent from religious education textbooks. As a result, the textbooks were reduced to 24 lessons from the 50 lessons they had before.

In 2017 it was estimated that  Moroccans and 2000 Moroccan-Europeans had travelled to join the Islamic State caliphate in the Syrian Civil War, which along with other fighters from MENA countries contributed a significant force to ISIS.

According to a researcher at the Danish Institute for International Studies, Moroccan authorities appear to have a good grip on the jihadist situation and cooperates with European and US authorities. Moroccans are overrepresented in "diaspora terrorism", that is terrorism which takes place outside the borders of Morocco. For example, two Moroccans were behind the 2017 London Bridge attack and a Moroccan killed people by driving his van into pedestrians in La Rambla in the 2017 Barcelona terrorist attacks.

Mozambique 

Mozambique has seen an Islamist insurgency and terror attacks, by Ansar al-Sunna and ISIL, starting with October 2017, in the Cabo Delgado Province. By December 2020, more than 3,500 people have been killed and more than 400,000 people have been displaced.

Nigeria, Niger, Chad and Cameroon insurgency by Boko Haram 

Boko Haram is an Islamic extremist group based in northeastern Nigeria which began violent attacks in 2009, also active in Chad, Niger and northern Cameroon. In the 2009–2018 period, more than 27,000 people have been killed in the fighting in the countries around Lake Chad.

A study from June 2021 by the United Nations Development Programme (UNDP) estimates that nearly 350,000 have been killed by the Boko Haram insurgency.

Boko Haram consists of two factions, one is led by Abubakar Shekau and it uses suicide bombings and kill civilians indiscriminately. The other is named Islamic State West Africa Province and it generally attacks military and government installations.

Somalia and the Horn of Africa 
Al-Shabaab is a militant jihadist terrorist group based in East Africa, which emerged in 2006 as the youth wing of the Islamic Courts Union. A number of foreign jihadists have gone to Somalia to support al-Shabaab. In 2012, it pledged allegiance to the militant Islamist organization Al-Qaeda. It is a participant in the Somali Civil War, and is reportedly being used by Egypt to destabilize Ethiopia, and attracting converts from predominantly Christian Kenya.

In 2010, the group killed 76 people watching the 2010 World Cup in Uganda.

In 2017, al-Shabaab was estimated to have about 7000–9000 fighters. It has imposed a strict Sharia law in areas it controls, such as stoning adulterers and amputating hands of thieves.

Sudan 

 2000 Jarafa mosque massacre

Tanzania 
 1998 United States embassy bombings

Tunisia 
On 11 April 2002, a Tunisian Al-Qaeda operative used a truck bomb to attack the El Ghriba synagogue on Djerba island. The attack killed 19 people and injured 30 and was planned by Khalid Sheikh Mohammed and financed by a Pakistani resident of Spain.

On 18 March 2015, three militants attacked the Bardo National Museum in the Tunisian capital city of Tunis, and took hostages. Twenty-one people, mostly European tourists, were killed at the scene, and an additional victim died ten days later. Around fifty others were injured. Two of the gunmen, Tunisian citizens Yassine Labidi and Saber Khachnaoui were killed by police. Police treated the event as a terrorist attack.

In June 2015, a mass shooting claimed by the Islamic State was carried out at a hotel by Seifeddine Rezgui. Thirty-eight people were killed, the majority of whom were tourists from the United Kingdom.

Uganda 
 2010 Kampala bombings. On 11 July 2010, Al-Shabaab carried out suicide bombings at two locations in Kampala, the capital city of Uganda. The attacks left 74 dead and 85 injured.
 2021 Uganda bombings. From late October to mid-November 2021, the Allied Democratic Forces (ADF) and the Islamic State organization carried out four bombing attacks across Uganda.

Central Asia

Afghanistan 
According to Human Rights Watch, Taliban and Hezb-e-Islami Gulbuddin forces have "sharply escalated bombing and other attacks" against civilians since 2006. In 2006, "at least 669 Afghan civilians were killed in at least 350 armed attacks, most of which appear to have been intentionally launched at civilians or civilian objects".

Kyrgyzstan 
Kyrgyz-American brothers Dzhokhar Tsarnaev and Tamerlan Tsarnaev were responsible for the Boston Marathon bombing.

Tajikistan 
The government blamed the IMU (Islamic Movement of Uzbekistan) for training those responsible for carrying out a suicide car bombing of a police station in Khujand on 3 September 2010. Two policemen were killed and 25 injured.

Uzbekistan 

On 16 February 1999, six car bombs exploded in Tashkent, killing 16 and injuring more than 100, in what may have been an attempt to assassinate President Islam Karimov. The IMU was blamed.

The IMU launched a series of attacks in Tashkent and Bukhara in March and April 2004. Gunmen and female suicide bombers took part in the attacks, which mainly targeted police. The violence killed 33 militants, 10 policemen, and four civilians. The government blamed Hizb ut-Tahrir, though the Islamic Jihad Union (IJU) claimed responsibility.

Furkat Kasimovich Yusupov was arrested in the first half of 2004, and charged as the leader of a group that had carried out the 28 March bombing on behalf of Hizb ut-Tahrir.

On 30 July 2004, suicide bombers struck the entrances of the US and Israeli embassies in Tashkent. Two Uzbek security guards were killed in both bombings. The IJU again claimed responsibility.

Foreign commentators on Uzbek affairs speculated that the 2004 violence could have been the work of the IMU, Al-Qaeda, Hizb ut-Tahrir, or some other radical Islamic organization.

East Asia

China 

 1992 Ürümqi bombings
 1997 Ürümqi bus bombings
 2010 Aksu bombing
 2013 Tiananmen Square attack
 Kunming station massacre
 April 2014 Ürümqi attack
 May 2014 Ürümqi attack

South Asia

Bangladesh 

In Bangladesh, the group Jamaat-ul-Mujahideen Bangladesh was formed sometime in 1998, and gained prominence in 2001. The organization was officially banned in February 2005 after attacks on NGOs, but struck back in August when 300 bombs were detonated almost simultaneously throughout Bangladesh, targeting Shahjalal International Airport, government buildings and major hotels.

The Ansarullah Bangla Team (ABT), also called Ansar Bangla is an Islamic extremist organization in Bangladesh, implicated in crimes including some brutal attacks and murders of atheist bloggers from 2013 to 2015 and a bank heist in April 2015.

Harkat-ul-Jihad-al-Islami (Ḥarkat al-Jihād al-Islāmiyah, meaning "Islamic Jihad Movement", HuJI) is an Islamic fundamentalist organisation most active in South Asian countries of Pakistan, Bangladesh and India since the early 1990s. It was banned in Bangladesh in 2005.

India 

Lashkar-e-Taiba, Jaish-e-Mohammed, Al Badr & Hizbul Mujahideen are militant groups seeking accession of Kashmir to Pakistan from India. The Lashkar leadership describes Indian and Israel regimes as the main enemies of Islam and Pakistan. Lashkar-e-Toiba, along with Jaish-e-Mohammed, another militant group active in Kashmir are on the United States' foreign terrorist organizations list, and are also designated as terrorist groups by the United Kingdom, India, Australia and Pakistan. Jaish-e-Mohammed was formed in 1994 and has carried out a series of attacks all over India. The group was formed after the supporters of Maulana Masood Azhar split from another Islamic militant organization, Harkat-ul-Mujahideen. Jaish-e-Mohammed is viewed by some as the "deadliest" and "the principal terrorist organization in Jammu and Kashmir". The group was also implicated in the kidnapping and murder of American journalist Daniel Pearl. All these groups coordinate under leadership of Syed Salahuddin's United Jihad Council.

Some major bomb blasts and attacks in India were perpetrated by Islamic militants from Pakistan, e.g., the 2008 Mumbai attacks and 2001 Indian Parliament attack.

2006 Mumbai train bombings killed 209 people and injured 700 more. It was carried out by banned Students Islamic Movement of India terrorist groups.

Pakistan

Sri Lanka 
The 2019 Sri Lanka Easter bombings, orchestrated by the National Thowheeth Jama'ath, were the deadliest terrorist attack in the country since its civil war ended on 16 May 2009. The bombings killed 269 people and injured more than 500.

Southeast Asia

Indonesia

Philippines 

The Abu Sayyaf Group, also known as al-Harakat al-Islamiyya, is one of several militant Islamic-separatist groups based in and around the southern islands of the Philippines, in Autonomous Region in Muslim Mindanao (Jolo, Basilan, and Mindanao) where for almost 30 years various Muslim groups have been engaged in an insurgency for a state, independent of the predominantly Christian Philippines. The name of the group is derived from the Arabic ابو, abu ("father of") and sayyaf ("Swordsmith"). Since its inception in the early 1990s, the group has carried out bombings, assassinations, kidnappings and extortion in their fight for an independent Islamic state in western Mindanao and the Sulu Archipelago with the stated goal of creating a pan-Islamic superstate across southeast Asia, spanning from east to west; the island of Mindanao, the Sulu Archipelago, the island of Borneo (Malaysia, Indonesia), the South China Sea, and the Malay Peninsula (Peninsular Malaysia, Thailand and Myanmar). The U.S. Department of State has branded the group a terrorist entity by adding it to the list of Foreign Terrorist Organizations.

Thailand 

Most of the terrorist incidents in Thailand are related to the South Thailand insurgency.

Europe 

Lethal attacks on civilians in Europe which have been credited to Islamist terrorism include the 2004 bombings of commuter trains in Madrid, where 191 people were killed, the 7 July 2005 London bombings, also of public transport, which killed 52 commuters, and the 2015 Charlie Hebdo shooting, in Paris, where 12 people were killed in response to the satirical weekly newspaper Charlie Hebdo depicting cartoons of Muhammad. On 13 November 2015 the French capital suffered a series of coordinated attacks, claimed by ISIS, that killed 129 people in restaurants, the Bataclan theatre and the Stade de France.

Out of 1,009 arrests for terrorism in 2008, 187 were in relation to Islamist terrorism. The report showed that the majority of Islamist terror suspects were second or third generation immigrants.

In 2009, a Europol report showed that more than 99% of terrorist attacks in Europe over the last three years were, carried out by non-Muslims. Swedish economist Tino Sanandaji has criticised the use of statistics where the number of attacks are counted instead of the number of killed, since 79% of terrorist deaths 2001–2011 in Europe were due to Islamic terrorism. Therefore, statistics focusing on the number of attacks instead of the number killed are exploited by those who wish to trivialise the phenomenon. The great difference in the number of attacks versus the number of killed is that separatist attacks in Spain, typically involve vandalism and not killing. So in statistics, the global terrorist plot leading to the 9/11 attack and a party headquarters being vandalised and painted with slogans by domestic terrorists each count as one terrorist attack. According to a report by Europol on terrorism in the European Union, in 2016 "nearly all reported fatalities and most of the casualties were the result of jihadist terrorist attacks." A majority of about two-thirds of all terrorist-related arrests in the EU were also jihadist-related.

The majority of deaths by terrorism in Europe from 2001 to 2014 were caused by Islamic terrorism, not including Islamic terrorist attacks in European Russia.

According to the British think tank ICSR, up to 40% of terrorist plots in Europe are part-financed through petty crime such as drug-dealing, theft, robberies, loan fraud and burglaries. Jihadists use ordinary crime as a way to finance their activity and have also argued this to be the "ideologically correct" way to wage jihad in non-Muslim lands.

The pattern of jihadist attacks in 2017 led Europol to conclude that terrorists preferred to attack people rather than causing property damage or loss of capital.

According to Europol, the jihadist attacks in 2017 had three patterns:

Indiscriminate killings: London March & June attacks and Barcelona attacks.
Attacks on Western lifestyle: the Manchester bombing in May 2017.
Attacks on symbols of authority: Paris attacks in February, June and August.

The agency's report also noted that jihadist attacks had caused more deaths and casualties than any other type of terrorist attack, that such attacks had become more frequent, and that there had been a decrease in the sophistication and preparation of the attacks.

According to Susanne Schröter, the 2017 attacks in European countries showed that the military defeat of the Islamic State did not mean the end of Islamist violence. Schröter also wrote that the events in Europe looked like a delayed implementation of jihadist strategy formulated by Abu Musab al-Suri in 2005, where an intensification of terror should destabilise societies and encourage Muslim youth to revolt. The expected civil war never materialised Europe, but did occur in other regions such as North Africa and the Philippines.

In April 2018, EU anti-terror coordinator estimated there to be 50,000 radicalized Muslims living in Europe.

Austria 
 2020 Vienna attack

Belgium

Finland

France 

France had its first occurrences with religious extremism in the 1980s due to French involvement in the Lebanese Civil War. In the 1990s, a series of attacks on French soil were executed by the Armed Islamic Group of Algeria (GIA).

In the 1990–2010 time span, France experienced repeated attacks linked to international jihadist movements. Le Monde reported on 26 July 2016 that "Islamist Terrorism" had caused 236 dead in France in the preceding 18-month period.

In the 2015–2018 timespan in France, 249 people been killed in terrorist attacks and 928 wounded in a total of 22 terrorist attacks.

The deadly attacks in 2015 in France changed the issue of Islamist radicalization from a security threat to also constitute a social problem. Prime minister François Hollande and prime minister Manuel Valls saw the fundamental values of the French republic being challenged and called them attacks against secular, enlightenment and democratic values along with "what makes us who we are".

Although jihadists in the 2015-onward timeframe legitimized their attacks with a narrative of reprisal for France's participation in the international coalition fighting the Islamic State, Islamic terrorism in France has other, deeper and older causes. The main reasons France suffers frequent attacks are, in no particular order:

 France's secular domestic policies (Laïcité) which jihadists perceive to be hostile towards Islam. Also, France's status as an officially secular nation and jihadists label France as "the flagship of disbelief".
France has a strong cultural tradition in comics, which in the context Muhammad cartoons is a question of freedom of expression.
France has a large Muslim minority
France's foreign policy towards Muslim countries and jihadist fronts. France is seen as the spearhead directed against jihadist groups in Africa, just as the United States is seen as the main force opposing jihadist groups elsewhere. France's former foreign policies such as that as its colonization of Muslim countries is also brought up in jihadist propaganda, for example, that the influence of French education, culture and political institutions had served to erase the Muslim identity of those colonies and their inhabitants.
 Jihadists consider France as a strong proponent of disbelief. For instance, Marianne, the national emblem of France, is considered as "a false idol" by jihadists and the French to be "idol worshippers". France also has no law against blasphemy and an anticlerical satirical press which is less respectful towards religion than that of the US or the United Kingdom. The French nation state is also perceived as an obstacle towards establishing a caliphate.
In 2020 two Islamic terrorist attacks were foiled by authorities, bringing the total to 33 since 2017 according to Laurent Nuñez, the director of CNRLT, who declared that Sunni Islamist terrorism was a prioritised threat. Nuñez drew parallels between the three attacks of 2020 which all were attacks on "blasphemy and the will to avenge their prophet".

Germany 
In the 2015–2020 time span, there were 9 Islamic terrorist attacks and thwarted terrorist plots where at least one of the perpetrators had entered Germany as an asylum seeker during the European migrant crisis. The Islamic terrorists entered Germany either without identity documents or with falsified documents. The number of discovered plots began to decline in 2017. In 2020 German authorities noted that the majority of the asylum seekers entered Germany without identification papers during the crisis and security agencies considered unregulated immigration as problematic from a security aspect.

Italy 

Despite its proximity to the Middle East and North Africa, relatively porous borders, and a large influx of migrants from Muslim majority countries, Italy has not experienced the same surge in radicalization as other European countries. Just 125 individuals with ties to Italy left to join jihadist groups, compared with Belgium's 470 and Sweden's 300 such individuals in the same period from their much smaller populations. Since the September 11 attacks in 2001, there have been a small number of plots either thwarted or failed. Two individuals born in Italy have been involved in terrorist attacks, Youssef Zaghba one of the trio of attackers in the June 2017 London Bridge attack while ISIS sympathizer Tomasso Hosni attacked soldiers at Milan's Central station in May 2017.

Deportation (expulsion) of suspects who are foreign nationals has been the cornerstone of Italy's preventive counter-terrorism strategy against jihadists. Deportees are prohibited from re-entering Italy and the entire Schengen Area for at least five years. This measure is particularly effective because in Italy, unlike in other Western European countries, many radicalized Muslims are first-generation immigrants without Italian citizenship. As elsewhere in Europe, prison inmates show signs of radicalization while incarcerated. In 2018, 41 individuals were deported upon release. Of the 147 people deported from 2015 to 2017, all were related to Islamist radicalization and 12 were imams. From January 2015 to April 2018, 300 individuals were expelled from Italian soil. The vast majority of the deportees come from North Africa, with most of the deportees come from Morocco, Tunisia and Egypt. A noted group came from the Balkans, with 13 individuals from Albania, 14 from Kosovo and 12 from Macedonia. A smaller group were from Asia, with Pakistanis constituting the largest group.

Netherlands

Attacks in the Netherlands 
 Murder of Theo van Gogh on 2 November 2004. Dutch filmmaker and political activist Theo van Gogh was assassinated by Mohammed Bouyeri, a second-generation Moroccan-Dutchman, Islamist and member of the Hofstad Network.
 2018 Amsterdam stabbing attack: On 31 August 2018, a man randomly attacked two people in Amsterdam Centraal station with a blade weapon – both victims were American-Eritrean tourists who were injured. The attacker was a 19-year-old from Afghanistan under the name Jawad S. who held a German residency permit and was denied asylum there. The suspect was aggrieved at the Netherlands for insulting Islam, directly referring to politician Geert Wilders.
 Utrecht tram shooting: On 18 March 2019, Gökmen Tanis carried out a shooting attack against tram passengers in Utrecht, killing four civilians and wounding six others. Tanis was arrested and convicted of murder with terrorist intent and sentenced to life in prison. He expressed support for Islamic extremism.

Norway 
In 2012, two men were sentenced in Oslo to seven and a half years in jail for an attack against Mohammad-cartoonist Kurt Westergaard. This was the first sentence under the new anti-terror legislation. A third man was freed from the accusation of terrorism, but was sentenced for helping with explosives and he received a fourth-month prison sentence.

Poland 
In 2015, the terrorist threat level was zero, on its scale which has four levels plus the "zero level". About 20–40 Polish nationals had travelled to the conflict zone in Syria-Iraq.

Russia 

Politically and religiously motivated attacks on civilians in Russia have been traced to separatist sentiment among the largely Muslim population of its North Caucasus region, particularly in Chechnya, where the central government of the Russian Federation has waged two bloody wars against the local secular separatist government since 1994. In the Moscow theater hostage crisis in October 2002, three Chechen separatist groups took an estimated 850 people hostage in the Russian capital; at least 129 hostages died during the storming by Russian special forces, all but one killed by the chemicals used to subdue the attackers (whether this attack would more properly be called a nationalist rather than an Islamist attack is in question). In the September 2004 Beslan school hostage crisis more than 1,000 people were taken hostage after a school in the Russian republic of North Ossetia–Alania was seized by a pro-Chechen multi-ethnic group aligned to Riyad-us Saliheen Brigade of Martyrs; hundreds of people died during the storming by Russian forces.

Since 2000, Russia has also experienced a string of suicide bombings that killed hundreds of people in the Caucasian republics of Chechnya, Dagestan and Ingushetia, as well as in Russia proper including Moscow. Responsibility for most of these attacks was claimed by either Shamil Basayev's Islamic-nationalist rebel faction or, later, by Dokka Umarov's pan-Islamist movement Caucasus Emirate which is aiming to unite most of Russia's North Caucasus as an emirate since its creation in 2007. Since the creation of the Caucasus Emirate, the group has abandoned its secular nationalist goals and fully adopted the ideology of Salafist-takfiri Jihadism which seeks to advance the cause of Allah on the earth by waging war against the Russian government and non-Muslims in the North Caucasus, such as the local Sufi Muslim population, whom they view as mushrikeen (polytheists) who do not adhere to true Islamic teachings. In 2011, the U.S. Department of State included the Caucasus Emirate on its list of terrorist organisations.

Spain

Sweden

Islamic terror attacks in Sweden 
In 2010, Taimour Abdulwahab al-Abdaly, an Iraqi-born Swedish citizen, attempted to kill Christmas shoppers in Stockholm in the 2010 Stockholm bombings. According to investigations by FBI, the bombing would likely have killed between 30 and 40 people had it succeeded, and it is thought that al-Abdaly operated with a network.

In April 2017 Rakhmat Akilov, a 39-year-old rejected asylum seeker born in the Soviet Union and a citizen of Uzbekistan, drove a truck down a pedestrian area in Stockholm and killed five people and injured dozens of others in the 2017 Stockholm truck attack. He has expressed sympathy with extremist organizations, among them the Islamic State of Iraq and the Levant (ISIL).

Balkans

Middle East/West Asia

Turkey 
Historians have said that militant Islamism first gained ground among Kurds before its appeal grew among ethnic Turks and that the two most important radical Islamist organizsations have been an outgrowth of Kurdish Islamism rather than Turkish Islamism. The Turkish or Kurdish Hizbullah is a primarily Kurdish group has its roots in the predominantly Kurdish southeast of Turkey and among Kurds who migrated to the cities in Western Turkey. The members of the İBDA-C were predominantly Kurds, most members if not all are ethnic Kurds like its founder, as in the Hizbullah. The İBDA-C stressed its Kurdish roots, and is fighting Turkish secularism, and is also anti-Christian. The Hizbula reestablished in 2003 in southeastern Turkey and "today its ideology might be more widespread than ever among Kurds there". The influence of these groups confirms "the continuing Kurdish domination of Turkish islamism". Notable Kurdish Islamists include also(an Iraqi Kurd born in Sudan) co-founder of the Islamist terrorist network al-Qaeda. There is a strong Kurdish element in Turkish radical Islamism. Kurdish and Turkish Islamists have also co-operated together, one example being the 2003 Istanbul bombings, and this co-operation has also been observed in Germany, as in the case of the Sauerland terror cell. Political scientist Guido Steinberg stated that many top leaders of Islamist organizations in Turkey fled to Germany in the 2000s, and that the Turkish Hizbullah has also "left an imprint on Turkish Kurds in Germany". Also many Kurds from Iraq (there are about 50,000 to 80,000 Iraqi Kurds in Germany) financially supported Kurdish-Islamist groups like Ansar al Islam. Many Islamists in Germany are ethnic Kurds (Iraqi and Turkish Kurds) or Turks. Before 2006, the German Islamist scene was dominated by Iraqi Kurds and Palestinians, but since 2006 Kurds and Turks from Turkey are dominant.

Hezbollah in Turkey (unrelated to the Shia Hezbollah in Lebanon) is a Sunni terrorist group accused of a series of attacks, including the November 2003 bombings of two synagogues, the British consulate in Istanbul and HSBC bank headquarters that killed 58.  Hizbullah's leader, Hüseyin Velioğlu, was killed in action by Turkish police in Beykoz on 17 January 2000. Besides Hizbullah, other Islamic groups listed as a terrorist organization by Turkish police counter-terrorism include Great Eastern Islamic Raiders' Front, al-Qaeda in Turkey, Tevhid-Selam (also known as al-Quds Army), and Kalifatstaat ("Caliphate State", Hilafet Devleti). Islamic Party of Kurdistan and Hereketa İslamiya Kurdistan are also Islamist groups active against Turkey, however unlike Hizbullah they're yet to be listed as active terrorist organizations in Turkey by Turkish police counter-terrorism.

Iraq 

The area that has seen some of the worst terror attacks in modern history has been Iraq as part of the Iraq War. In 2005, there were more than 400 incidents of suicide bombing attacks, killing more than 2,000 people. In 2006, almost half of all reported terrorist attacks in the world (6,600), and more than half of all terrorist fatalities (13,000), occurred in Iraq, according to the National Counterterrorism Center of the United States. Along with nationalist groups and criminal, non-political attacks, the Iraqi insurgency includes Islamist insurgent groups, such as Al-Qaeda in Iraq, who favor suicide attacks far more than non-Islamist groups. At least some of the terrorism has a transnational character in that some foreign Islamic jihadists have joined the insurgency.

Israel and the Palestinian territories 

Hamas ("zeal" in Arabic and an acronym for Harakat al-Muqawama al-Islamiyya) grew in power and began attacks on military and civilian targets in Israel at the beginning of the First Intifada in 1987. The 1988 charter of Hamas calls for the destruction of Israel. Hamas's armed wing, the Izz ad-Din al-Qassam Brigades, was established in mid 1991 and claimed responsibility for numerous attacks against Israelis, principally suicide bombings and rocket attacks. Hamas has been accused of sabotaging the Israeli-Palestine peace process by launching attacks on civilians during Israeli elections to anger Israeli voters and facilitate the election of harder-line Israeli candidates. Hamas has been designated as a terrorist group by Canada, the United States, Israel, Australia, Japan, the United Nations Commission on Human Rights and Human Rights Watch. It is banned in Jordan. Russia does not consider Hamas a terrorist group as it was "democratically elected". During the Second Intifada (September 2000 through August 2005) 39.9 percent of the suicide attacks were carried out by Hamas. The first Hamas suicide attack was the Mehola Junction bombing in 1993. Hamas claims its aims are "To contribute in the effort of liberating Palestine and restoring the rights of the Palestinian people under the sacred Islamic teachings of the Holy Quran, the Sunna (traditions) of Prophet Mohammad (peace and blessings of Allah be upon him) and the traditions of Muslims rulers and scholars noted for their piety and dedication."

Islamic Jihad Movement in Palestine is a Palestinian Islamist group based in the Syrian capital, Damascus, and dedicated to waging jihad to eliminate the state of Israel. It was formed by Palestinian Fathi Shaqaqi in the Gaza Strip following the Iranian Revolution which inspired its members. From 1983 onward, it engaged in "a succession of violent, high-profile attacks" on Israeli targets. The Intifada which "it eventually sparked" was quickly taken over by the much larger Palestine Liberation Organization and Hamas. Beginning in September 2000, it started a campaign of suicide bombing attacks against Israeli civilians. The PIJ's armed wing, the Al-Quds brigades, has claimed responsibility for numerous terrorist attacks in Israel, including suicide bombings. The group has been designated as a terrorist organization by several Western countries.

Popular Resistance Committees is a coalition of a number of armed Palestinian groups opposed to what they regard as the conciliatory approach of the Palestinian Authority and Fatah towards Israel. The PRC is especially active in the Gaza Strip, through its military wing, the Al-Nasser Salah al-Deen Brigades. The PRC is said to have an extreme Islamic worldview and operates with Hamas and the Islamic Jihad movement. The PRC has carried out several attacks against Israeli civilians and soldiers including hundreds of shooting attacks and other rocket and bombing attacks.

Other groups linked with Al-Qaeda operate in the Gaza Strip including: Army of Islam, Abdullah Azzam Brigades, Jund Ansar Allah, Jaljalat and Tawhid al-Jihad.

Lebanon 

Hezbollah first emerged in 1982, as a militia during the 1982 Lebanon War. Its leaders were inspired by the Ayatollah Khomeini, and its forces were trained and organized by a contingent of Iran's Islamic Revolutionary Guard Corps. Hezbollah's 1985 manifesto listed its three main goals as "putting an end to any colonialist entity" in Lebanon, bringing the Phalangists to justice for "the crimes they [had] perpetrated", and the establishment of an Islamic regime in Lebanon. Hezbollah leaders have also made numerous statements calling for the destruction of Israel, which they refer to as a "Zionist entity... built on lands wrested from their owners."

Hezbollah, which started with only a small militia, has grown to an organization with seats in the Lebanese government, a radio and a satellite television-station, and programs for social development. They maintain strong support among Lebanon's Shi'a population, and gained a surge of support from Lebanon's broader population (Sunni, Christian, Druze) immediately following the 2006 Lebanon War, and are able to mobilize demonstrations of hundreds of thousands. Hezbollah along with some other groups began the 2006–2008 Lebanese political protests in opposition to the government of Prime Minister Fouad Siniora. A later dispute over Hezbollah preservation of its telecoms network led to clashes and Hezbollah-led opposition fighters seized control of several West Beirut neighborhoods from Future Movement militiamen loyal to Fouad Siniora. These areas were then handed over to the Lebanese Army.

A national unity government was formed in 2008, in Lebanon, giving Hezbollah and its opposition allies control of 11 of 30 cabinets seats; effectively veto power. Hezbollah receives its financial support from the governments of Iran and Syria, as well as donations from Lebanese people and foreign Shi'as. It has also gained significantly in military strength in the 2000s. Despite a June 2008 certification by the United Nations that Israel had withdrawn from all Lebanese territory, in August, Lebanon's new Cabinet unanimously approved a draft policy statement which secures Hezbollah's existence as an armed organization and guarantees its right to "liberate or recover occupied lands". Since 1992, the organization has been headed by Hassan Nasrallah, its Secretary-General. The United States, Canada, Israel, Bahrain, France, Gulf Cooperation Council, and the Netherlands regard Hezbollah as a terrorist organization, while the United Kingdom, the European Union and Australia consider only Hezbollah's military wing or its external security organization to be a terrorist organization. Many consider it, or a part of it, to be a terrorist group responsible for blowing up the American embassy and later its annex, as well as the barracks of American and French peacekeeping troops and dozens of kidnappings of foreigners in Beirut. It is also accused of being the recipient of massive aid from Iran, and of serving "Iranian foreign policy calculations and interests", or serving as a "subcontractor of Iranian initiatives" Hezbollah denies any involvement or dependence on Iran. In the Arab and Muslim worlds, on the other hand, Hezbollah is regarded as a legitimate and successful resistance movement that drove both Western powers and Israel out of Lebanon. In 2005, the Lebanese Prime Minister said of Hezbollah, it "is not a militia. It's a resistance."

Fatah al-Islam is an Islamist group operating out of the Nahr al-Bared refugee camp in northern Lebanon. It was formed in November 2006, by fighters who broke off from the pro-Syrian Fatah al-Intifada, itself a splinter group of the Palestinian Fatah movement, and is led by a Palestinian fugitive militant named Shaker al-Abssi. The group's members have been described as militant jihadists, and the group itself has been described as a terrorist movement that draws inspiration from al-Qaeda. Its stated goal is to reform the Palestinian refugee camps under Islamic sharia law, and its primary targets are the Lebanese authorities, Israel and the United States.

Saudi Arabia

Syria

Yemen

North America

Canada 

According to recent government statements Islamic terrorism is the biggest threat to Canada. The Canadian Security Intelligence Service (CSIS) reported that terrorist radicalization at home is now the chief preoccupation of Canada's spy agency. The most notorious arrest in Canada's fight on terrorism, was the 2006 Ontario terrorism plot in which 18 Al-Qaeda-inspired cell members were arrested for planning a mass bombing, shooting, and hostage taking terror plot throughout Southern Ontario. There have also been other arrests mostly in Ontario involving terror plots.

United States 

Between 1993 and 2001, the major attacks or attempts against U.S. interests stemmed from militant Islamic jihad extremism except for the 1995 Oklahoma City bombing. On 11 September 2001, nearly 3,000 people were killed in New York City, Washington, DC, and Stonycreek Township near Shanksville, Pennsylvania, during the September 11 attacks organized by 19 al-Qaeda members and largely perpetrated by Saudi nationals, sparking the War on Terror. Former CIA Director Michael Hayden considers homegrown terrorism to be the most dangerous threat and concern faced by American citizens today. As of July 2011, there have been 52 homegrown jihadist extremist plots or attacks in the United States since the 11 September attacks.

One of the worst mass shootings in U.S. history was committed by a Muslim against LGBT people. Omar Mateen, in an act motivated by the terrorist group Islamic State, shot and murdered 49 people and wounded more than 50 in a gay nightclub, Pulse, in Orlando, Florida.

Oceania

Australia 
 2014 Endeavour Hills stabbings
 2014 Lindt Cafe siege
 2015 Parramatta shooting
 2017 Brighton siege
 2018 Melbourne stabbing attack

New Zealand 
 2021 Auckland supermarket stabbing

South America

Argentina 
The 1992 attack on Israeli embassy in Buenos Aires, was a suicide bombing attack on the building of the Israeli embassy of Argentina, located in Buenos Aires, which was carried out on 17 March 1992. Twenty-nine civilians were killed in the attack and 242 additional civilians were injured. A group called Islamic Jihad Organization, which has been linked to Iran and possibly Hezbollah, claimed responsibility.

An incident from 1994, known as the AMIA bombing, was an attack on the Asociación Mutual Israelita Argentina (Argentine Israelite Mutual Association) building in Buenos Aires. It occurred on 18 July and killed 85 people and injured hundreds more. Prosecutors Alberto Nisman and Marcelo Martínez Burgos formally accused the government of Iran of directing the bombing, and the Hezbollah militia of carrying it out. The prosecution claimed that Argentina had been targeted by Iran after Buenos Aires' decision to suspend a nuclear technology transfer contract to Tehran.

On 18 January 2015, Nisman was found dead at his home in Buenos Aires, one day before he was scheduled to report on his findings, with supposedly incriminating evidence against high-ranking officials of the then-current Argentinian government including former president Cristina Fernández de Kirchner.

Transnational 

Al-Qaeda's stated aim is the use of jihad to defend and protect Islam against Zionism, Christianity, the secular West, and Muslim governments such as Saudi Arabia, which it sees as insufficiently Islamic and too closely tied to the United States. Formed by Osama bin Laden and Muhammad Atef in the aftermath of the Soviet–Afghan War in the late 1980s, al-Qaeda called for the use of violence against civilians and military of the United States and any countries that are allied with it.

Organizations 

 Abu Sayyaf, Philippines
 Al-Aqsa Martyrs' Brigades, Gaza Strip and West Bank
 Al-Gama'a al-Islamiyya, Egypt
 Al-Muhajiroun, Saudi Arabia, Pakistan, UK
 Al-Qaeda, worldwide
 Al-Shabaab, Somalia
 Ansar al-Islam, Iraq
 Ansar al-sharia, Libya
 Armed Islamic Group (GIA), Algeria
 Boko Haram, Nigeria
 Caucasus Emirate (IK), Russia
 East Turkestan Islamic Movement (ETIM), China
 Egyptian Islamic Jihad, Egypt
 Great Eastern Islamic Raiders' Front (İBDA-C), Turkey
 Hamas, Gaza Strip and West Bank 
 Harkat-ul-Jihad-al-Islami Bangladesh, Bangladesh
 Harkat-ul-Mujahideen al-Alami, Pakistan
 Hezbollah, Lebanon 
 Indian Mujahideen, India 
 Students' Islamic Movement of India, India
 Islamic Movement of Central Asia, Central Asia
 Islamic Movement of Uzbekistan, Uzbekistan
 Islamic State of Iraq and the Levant, worldwide
 Jaish-e-Mohammed, Pakistan and Kashmir
 Jamaat Ansar al-Sunna, Iraq
 Jemaah Islamiyah, Indonesia
 Lashkar-e-Taiba, Pakistan and Kashmir
 Lashkar-e-Jhangvi, Pakistan
 Maute group, Philippines
 Moro Islamic Liberation Front, Philippines
 Moroccan Islamic Combatant Group, Morocco and Europe
 National Thowheeth Jama'ath, Sri Lanka
 Palestinian Islamic Jihad, Gaza Strip and West Bank
 Tawhid and Jihad, Iraq  
 Tehrik-i-Taliban Pakistan, Pakistan and Afghanistan
Jundallah, Pakistan

See also 

 9/11
 26/11
 Arab–Israeli conflict
 Christian terrorism
 Criticism of Islamism
 Domestic terrorism
 History of terrorism
 Iran and state-sponsored terrorism
 Islam: What the West Needs to Know
 Islamic extremism
 Islamism
 Jewish religious terrorism
 Jihadism
 List of Islamist terrorist attacks
 Palestinian political violence
 Religion and peacebuilding
 Religion of peace
 Religious war
 United States and state-sponsored terrorism
 Afzal Guru
 Ajmal Kasab

References

Notes

Citations

Bibliography

Further reading 

 
 
 
 
 
 
 
 
 
 
 
 Gabriel, Brigitte. (2006). Because They Hate: A Survivor of Islamic Terror Warns America. St. Martin's Press. 
 
 
 
 .
 Kepel, Gilles. Jihad: The Trail of Political Islam.
 Kepel, Gilles. The War for Muslim Minds.
 
 
 
 
 

 
Criticism of Islam
Islam-related controversies
Religious terrorism